= Akkur, Channapatna =

Akkur, Channapatna Akkuru
- Village
- Location in Karnataka, India Akkur, Channapatna (India)
- Coordinates: 12.5648350°N 77.1993087°E
- Country: India
- State: Karnataka
- District: Bengaluru South
- Talukas: Channapatna

Government
  - Body: Village Panchayat

Population (2011)
  - Total: 2,869

Languages
  - Official: Kannada
- Time zone: UTC+5:30 (IST)
- Postal code: 562138
- Vehicle registration: KA-42
- Nearest city: Channapatna
- Civic agency: Village Panchayat

Akkuru is a village in the southern state of Karnataka, India. It is located in the Channapatna taluk of Bengaluru South district.

== See also ==
- Ramanagara
- Kodamballi
- KM Doddi
- Districts of Karnataka
