= Manteswami Kavya =

Epic narrative of the Palegars in Karnataka, India

Manteswamy Kavya is one of the most important oral epics of Karnataka. Neelgaras, the professional singers of South Karnataka have kept the epic alive through centuries of performances in the districts of Mandya, Mysore, Ramanagara, Chamarajanagara and Bengaluru Rural.

Manteswamy was an holeya Community saint and a folk hero who lived during the fifteenth century (approximately). Legends are built around his life and the shrines at Chikkelluru, Boppegowdanapur, Mangadahalli(Channapatna) and Kappadi are related to the personalities depicted in the epic. Manteswamy is a living tradition in and around these regions. ‘Manteswamy Kavya’ treats him on par with Allamaprabhu the Veerashiava saint of the twelfth century and does not distinguish between them. However, this contention does not find many takers.

The epic begins with the arrival of Manteswamy in Kalyana, who makes a dramatic appearance on a dung heap at the entrance of the city, with the dead body of a calf and a gourd full of ‘kaLLu’. Basavanna’s wife arrives there and takes him to the palace where a confrontation between the sharanas and Manteswamy takes place. His greatness is proved equivocally and that heralds the victory of the lowly over insincere devotees.

After that, Manteswamy embarks upon a journey towards South Karnataka till he finds his permanent abode in Boppegowdanapura. This journey is punctuated by his efforts to acquire disciples. “Throughout the saga of Manteswamy, he picks up infants for his cause. This is symbolic. Each child represents a community that comes into the Manteswamy fold. Rachappaji, Doddamma of the Grove, Channajamma, Madivala Machayya, Phalaradayya, Chennapaji and Siddappaji are his chief followers. How he brought them into his fold, through ritual, craft and magic, makes up the saga.”(S.R.ramakrishna) Baachi Basavayya who wants to become his disciple is reborn as Baala Kempanna and later acquires the name Sidapaaji.

The confrontation of Siddappaaji with the Panchalas (Blacksmiths) of Halaguuru is fraught with symbolic qualities. This represents a stage in civilization when technology had to be liberated from its hereditary practitioners. This incident is narrated very dramatically. Finally, Manteswamy acquires many followers in a number of communities and settles down at Boppegowdanapura. His shrine is at this place. Two of his important disciples have their shrines at Chikkelluru and KappaDi. Another disciple Chennapaaji Swamy has his shrine at Mangadahalli near Channapatna. It is believed that Chennapaaji swamy resides at the Chennapaaji hill near Mangadahalli and Kodamballi. ‘Manteswamy Kavya’ and its cognate epics have many distinctive features. They have selected a language which is a dialect, both geographically and socially. This choice is remarkable in the context of literary texts. Secondly, the narrative style is a combination of the poetic, the dramatic and a simple narration in prose. This adds to the impact of the epic. Thirdly, it is episodic and each episode may be recited independently of its broader context. This work delineates the life of unlettered communities. Most of these epics have a theory regarding the origin of the universe and their community is usually found in the nucleus of the story. This gives a sense of identity and pride to these communities. Actually, they depict different stages in the history of civilization.
