= Honganur =

Coordinates: 12.604378°N 77.217484°E

Honganur Honganoor
- Village
- Interactive map of Honganur
- Country: India
- State: Karnataka
- District: Bengaluru South district

Population (2001)
  - Total: 7,043

Languages
  - Official: Kannada
- Time zone: UTC+5:30 (IST)

Honganur is a village in the Channapatna taluk of Bengaluru South district, in the southern state of Karnataka, India.

== Demographics ==
As of 2001 India census, Honganur had a population of 7043 with 3482 males and 3561 females.

== See also ==
- Bengaluru South district
- Districts of Karnataka
