= Mayasandra, Magadi =

Mayasandra Kannada
- Village
- Location in Karnataka, India Mayasandra (India) Mayasandra (Asia)
- Coordinates: 13.122°N 77.123°E
- Country: India
- State: Karnataka
- District: Bengaluru South

Languages
  - Official: Kannada
- Time zone: UTC+5:30 (IST)
- PIN: 561101
- Nearest city: Ramanagara, Magadi
- Civic agency: Gram Panchayat

Mayasandra is a medium size village located in Bengaluru South district, approximately 15 km from Shivagange. Mayasandra is surrounded by places including Beechanahalli, Sankighatta, Sugganahalli, Kudur, etc. When Ramanagara was carved out of Bangalore Rural in 2007, being part of Magadi taluk, Mayasandra became part of Ramanagara.

== Overview ==
Around 150 families reside in Mayasandra. Literacy rate of Mayasandra is 57.4%.

== Geography ==
Mayasandra shares a lake with its neighboring village, Beechanahalli. The main crops grown in this village includes ragi, wheat, banana, coconut, tomato, etc.

The location is accessible from Solur (around 16 km) or from Marur handpost (around 12 km) or from Thippasandra Handpost (around 12 km) - all of these locations lie right on NH 75 (Bangalore-Mangalore Highway). The location is also accessible from Dobbaspet via Shivagange or from Tumkur via Honnudike, Sugganahalli.

== See also ==
- Bengaluru South district
- Ramanagara
- Districts of Karnataka
