= Adarangi =

- village
- Interactive map of Adarangi
- Coordinates: 13.1214°N 77.1914°E
- Country: India
- State: Karnataka
- District: Bengaluru South
- Talukas: Magadi

Government
  - Body: Village Panchayat

Languages
  - Official: Kannada
- Time zone: UTC+5:30 (IST)
- Nearest city: Bengaluru
- Civic agency: Village Panchayat

Adarangi is a village in the southern state of Karnataka, India. It is located in the Magadi taluk of Bengaluru South district.

== See also ==
- Ramanagara
- Bengaluru South district
- Districts of Karnataka
