= Sathanur, Kanakapura =

Sathanur Sathanuru
- village
- Location in Karnataka, India Sathanur (India)
- Coordinates: 12.449542°N 77.319328°E
- Country: India
- State: Karnataka
- District: Bengaluru South
- Taluk: Kanakapura

Population (2011)
  - Total: 4,966

Languages
  - Official: Kannada
- Time zone: UTC+5:30 (IST)
- PIN: 562120
- ISO 3166 code: IN-KA
- Vehicle registration: KA
- Website: karnataka.gov.in

Sathanur is a village in Bengaluru South district of Karnataka, India. It is located around 70 km from the city of Bengaluru. The Bengaluru–Coimbatore National Highway 948 passes via this town.It is 18 km from Kanakapura and 27 km from Channapatna.

== Flora and fauna ==
Sathanur is located very close to Cheelanavadi, Uyyamballi and Kabbalamma forest Range of Cauvery Wildlife Sanctuary in Eastern Ghats, Karnataka. It is about 75 km from Bengaluru via Kanakapura. The place is a popular weekend picnic spot for nature & wildlife enthusiasts and bird watchers. Rosewood, teak and hardwood are abundantly found and over 100 species of birds are often spotted in the region in addition to wildlife like spotted deer, sambar deer, wild dogs and antelope to name a few. Mekedatu, a location along Kaveri in the border of Chamarajanagar and Bengaluru South districts is located 30 km from Sathanur. It takes a 25 km drive from Sathanur to Sangama, a place where Arkavati merges with Kaveri. From this point, about 3.5 kilometers downstream, the river Kaveri flows through a deep and narrow gorge. This area witness frequent fires in the forest range.

== Human–animal conflict ==
Some cases of poaching and illegal sale of ivory, nails, skin of wild animals are reported from Sathanur, and forest personnel take risk in catching hold of poachers. The farmers in the area were often worried on the attack by elephants straying into his farm during summers in search of paddy, ragi, mangoes and water. Forest department suggested farmers, to use bees and beehive boxes to repel elephants. Even the Railways use the same method to get away from elephant attacks. But the method backfired since it attracted hordes of sloth bears who destroyed the beehive boxes, which eventually cleared the way for elephants to attack. The farm owners were desperate to look for an alternate action and Stray dogs were compelled to watch over the farm plots and wind chimes from bottles were also used to avoid animal intervention. Bonfires, chain of CDs / DVDs off which solar powered flashlights to reflect light, chilli plants, ponds with ducks and fishes to make the water stink, electric fencing were the other methods used by farmhouse owners to keep elephants away. Sometimes Sloth Bear attacks humans leaving them dead or injured. Due to more people movement, even animals like leopard are killed in roads by fast moving vehicles near Sathanur.

== Infrastructure ==
A special economic zone was planned in Sathanur by DLF India Ltd in 2006. However, the project did not take off due to lack of participation A dam is proposed to be constructed in Mekedatu to meet the drinking water needs of the people. Later the project was dropped and Government of Karnataka decided to construct a bridge across the Cauvery, that will reduce the distance between Bengaluru and Male Mahadeshwara Hills or Hanur by 45 km. This will help the pilgrims going to Male Mahadeshwara Hills to reach quicker and improve the area since the road traffic is expected to increase.

== Politics ==
Sathanur hosted an Assembly seat earlier and was merged with Kanakapura constituency in 2008. The seat was popular since former Prime Minister H. D. Deve Gowda and former Minister D. K. Shivakumar represented it in the past.

== Demographics ==
=== 2011 ===
2011 Census data
| Population | Persons | Males | Females |
|---|---|---|---|
| Total | 4,966 | 2,527 | 2,439 |
| In the age group 0–6 years | 534 | 269 | 265 |
| Scheduled Castes (SC) | 1,225 | 630 | 595 |
| Scheduled Tribes (ST) | 57 | 22 | 35 |
| Literates | 3,317 | 1,839 | 1,478 |
| Illiterate | 1,649 | 688 | 961 |
| Total Worker | 2,031 | 1,479 | 552 |
| Main Worker | 1,790 | 1,341 | 449 |
| Main Worker - Cultivator | 374 | 300 | 74 |
| Main Worker - Agricultural Labourers | 431 | 264 | 167 |
| Main Worker - Household Industries | 86 | 35 | 51 |
| Main Worker - Other | 899 | 742 | 157 |
| Marginal Worker | 241 | 138 | 103 |
| Marginal Worker - Cultivator | 7 | 5 | 2 |
| Marginal Worker - Agriculture Labourers | 92 | 43 | 49 |
| Marginal Worker - Household Industries | 12 | 7 | 5 |
| Marginal Workers - Other | 130 | 83 | 47 |
| Marginal Worker (3-6 Months) | 185 | 108 | 77 |
| Marginal Worker - Cultivator (3-6 Months) | 4 | 3 | 1 |
| Marginal Worker - Agriculture Labourers (3-6 Months) | 84 | 38 | 46 |
| Marginal Worker - Household Industries (3-6 Months) | 12 | 7 | 5 |
| Marginal Worker - Other (3-6 Months) | 85 | 60 | 25 |
| Marginal Worker (0-3 Months) | 56 | 30 | 26 |
| Marginal Worker - Cultivator (0-3 Months) | 3 | 2 | 1 |
| Marginal Worker - Agriculture Labourers (0-3 Months) | 8 | 5 | 3 |
| Marginal Worker - Household Industries (0-3 Months) | 0 | 0 | 0 |
| Marginal Worker - Other Workers (0-3 Months) | 45 | 23 | 22 |
| Non Worker | 2,935 | 1,048 | 1,887 |
