= Achalu =

Achalu may refer to:

- Achalu (Kanakapura), village in India
- Achalu (Ramanagaram), village in India
