= Kanva Reservoir =

Lake in Karnataka, India

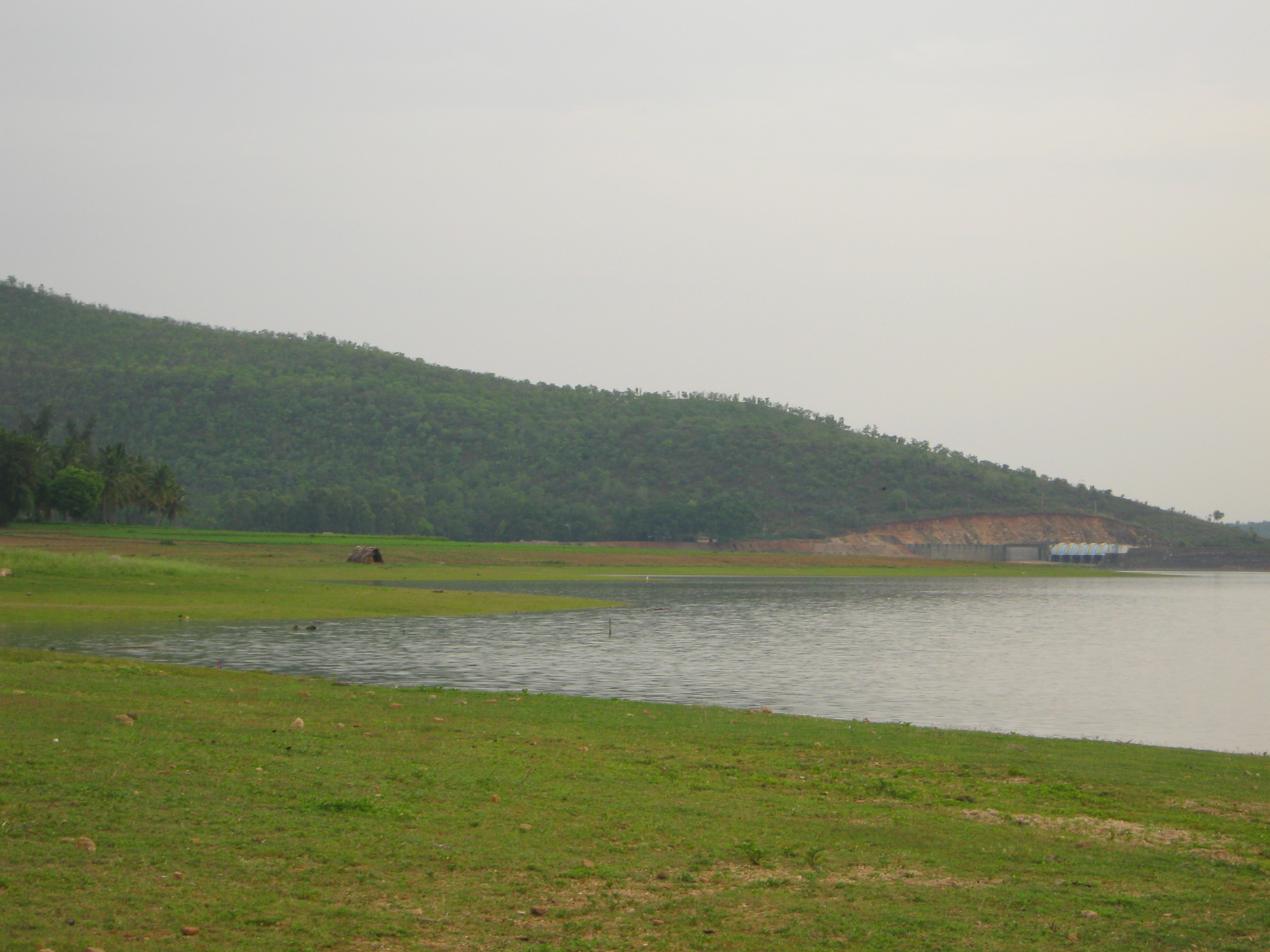
- Kanva Reservoir and Kanva Dam

- Location within Karnataka
- Location: Channapatna, Ramanagara District, Karnataka
- Coordinates: 12°43′45.36″N 77°11′53.45″E
- Type: reservoir
- Primary inflows: Kanva
- Primary outflows: Kanva
- Basin countries: India

Kanva Reservoir is an artificial lake and tourist attraction 69 kilometres (43 mi) from Bangalore, India, formed by the damming of the Kanva River in an irrigation project. The Kanva Reservoir is an artificial lake located in the Channapatna, a town known for its wooden toys. It was built in 1946 to serve as a source of drinking water for the surrounding areas, as well as for irrigation purposes. The reservoir is formed by a dam built across the Kaveri River, which is one of the largest rivers in South India. There is a fisheries training and research center near the dam, which was established to train the local residents in fish farming so that they could become economically independent.

== History ==
The Kanva Reservoir project was initiated in 1946 when the Mysore State Irrigation Department, under the technical advisement of Sir M. Visvesvaraya, constructed a masonry check dam across the Kanva River to provide reliable irrigation and drinking water for the semi‑arid Ramanagara region. The original outlay of approximately ₹40 lakh funded not only the dam but also the canal network designed to irrigate roughly 2,100 ha of farmland (1,400 ha on the right bank and 700 ha on the left). This strategic infrastructure immediately bolstered local agriculture, particularly ragi, coconut, and vegetable cultivation and remains central to the region’s agrarian economy.

== Kanva Dam ==
Kanva Dam is a masonry check dam stretching the full width of the Kanva River valley to impound a reservoir covering 776 hectares. This Dam was built with the advice of Sir M Vishveshwarayya. It was unique among the dams constructed in Karnataka after Independence, it employs five-hood siphon spillways, an automatic flood-control feature designed in 1940s. It discharges excess water once the reservoir reaches its maximum designed level, thereby protecting upstream villages and croplands without mechanical gates.

The dam was surrounded by gently undulating wooded hills of the Lan of Seven Hills, the Kanva Reservoir has evolved into a biodiverse habitat supporting over 40 species of resident and migratory birds, including waterfowl and kingfishers. A Fisheries Training and Research Center established near the dam provides locals with training in sustainable aquaculture, enhancing both livelihoods and fish stocks in the reservoir.

The reservoir is surrounded by wooded hills and offers good birdwatching. The cave temple of Purushotthama Thirtha Gavi 3 kilometres (1.9 mi) away is a pilgrimage center for Madhwa Brahmins. A statue of Hanuman has been placed inside the cave.
