= Kodihalli =

Kodihalli may refer to:

- Kodihalli, Ramanagara, a locality in Ramanagara, Karnataka
- Kodihalli, Kanakapura, a village in Kanakapura taluk in Ramanagara district, Karnataka
- Kodihalli, Bangalore, a locality in Bangalore, Karnataka
- Kodihalli, Arsikere, a village in arsikere taluk in hassan district, karnataka
