= Agrahara Valagerehalli =

Agrahara Varagerehalli
- village
- Agrahara Varagerehalli is in Bengaluru South district
- Interactive map of Agrahara Varagerehalli
- Coordinates: 12.574°N 77.160°E
- Country: India
- State: Karnataka
- District: Bengaluru South
- Talukas: Channapatna

Government
  - Body: Village Panchayat

Languages
  - Official: Kannada
- Time zone: UTC+5:30 (IST)
- Nearest city: Channapatna
- Civic agency: Village Panchayat

Agrahara Valagerehalli is a village in the southern state of Karnataka, India. It is located in the Channapatna taluk of Bengaluru South district in Karnataka.

== See also ==
- Bengaluru South district
- Districts of Karnataka
