= Thadikavagilu =

Thadikavagilu ತಡಿಕವಾಗಿಲು
- Village
- Location in Karnataka, India Thadikavagilu (India) Thadikavagilu (Asia)
- Coordinates: 12.815508°N 77.233130°E
- Country: India
- State: Karnataka
- District: Bengaluru South
- Sub-district: Ramanagara

Government
  - Type: Panchayat raj
  - Body: Gram panchayat

Area
  - Total: 493.94 ha (1,220.6 acres)

Population (2001)
  - Total: 802
  - Density: 162/km^{2} (421/sq mi)

Languages
  - Official: Kannada
- Time zone: UTC+5:30 (IST)
- PIN: 562159
- ISO 3166 code: IN-KA
- Vehicle registration: KA42
- Nearest city: Ramanagara, Magadi
- Literacy: 75%
- Vidhan Sabha constituency: Magadi
- Website: karnataka.gov.in

Thadikavagilu is a small village situated 16 km (10 mi) away from Ramanagara and 26 km (16 mi) from Magadi in the Bengaluru South district of Karnataka State. It comes under the Jalamangala grama panchayat.

The local language is Kannada.

Handicrafts are economically important. The main crops are millet, mango, coconut, and legumes. Domestic animals include sheep, goats, cows, and silkworms.

The village was founded c. 1925. The local school is the Government Senior Primary School Thadikavagilu, for grades 1-7.
