= Akkur, Ramanagaram =

Akkur
- village
- Akkur is in Bengaluru South district
- Country: India
- State: Karnataka
- District: Bengaluru South
- Talukas: Ramanagara

Government
  - Body: Village Panchayat

Languages
  - Official: Kannada
- Time zone: UTC+5:30 (IST)
- Nearest city: Ramanagara
- Civic agency: Village Panchayat

Akkur is a village in the southern state of Karnataka, India. It is located in the Ramanagara taluk of Bengaluru South district - 562159.

== See also ==
- Bengaluru South district
- Districts of Karnataka
