= Kodihalli, Kanakapura =

Kodihalli
- small town
- Nickname: Santhe Kodihalli
- Location in Karnataka, India Kodihalli (India)
- Coordinates: 12°26′N 77°30′E
- Country: India
- State: Karnataka
- District: Bengaluru South
- Taluk: Kanakapura

Population (2001)
  - Total: 5,895

Languages
  - Official: Kannada
- Time zone: UTC+5:30 (IST)
- Postal code: 562119
- Vehicle registration: KA 42

Kodihalli is a village in the southern state of Karnataka, India. It is located in the Kanakapura taluk of Bengaluru South district in Karnataka. It is 17 km from Taluk headquarters Kanakapura and 45 km from district headquarters Ramanagara.

== Demographics ==
As of 2001 India census, Kodihalli had a population of 5895 with 3050 males and 2845 females. It is also a hobli centre in the Kanakapura Taluk and the majority caste is vokkaliga.

== See also ==
- Bengaluru South district
- Districts of Karnataka
