= Balaguli =

Balaguli is a village in Bengaluru South district of Karnataka state of India
