= Mudenahalli =

Town in Karnataka, India

Mudenahalli is a town in Bengaluru South district, Karnataka, India. The total population of Mudenahalli is 1183, composed of 604 males and 579 females living in 231 houses.

The nearest railway station is in Bengaluru.
