= Achalu (Ramanagaram) =

- village
- Achalu (Ramanagaram) is in Bengaluru South district
- Interactive map of Achalu
- Coordinates: 12.7006°N 77.2901°E
- Country: India
- State: Karnataka
- District: Bengaluru South
- Talukas: Ramanagaram

Government
  - Body: Village Panchayat

Languages
  - Official: Kannada
- Time zone: UTC+5:30 (IST)
- Nearest city: Bengaluru
- Civic agency: Village Panchayat

Achalu (Ramanagaram) is a village in the southern state of Karnataka, India. It is located in the Ramanagaram taluk of Bengaluru South district in Karnataka.

== See also ==
- Bengaluru South district
- Districts of Karnataka
