= Adakamaranahalli, Bengaluru South district =

Adakamaranahalli
- village
- Adakamaranahalli (Magadi) is in Bengaluru South district
- Interactive map of Adakamaranahalli
- Coordinates: 12.9466°N 77.3097°E
- Country: India
- State: Karnataka
- District: Bengaluru South
- Talukas: Magadi

Government
  - Body: Village Panchayat

Languages
  - Official: Kannada
- Time zone: UTC+5:30 (IST)
- Nearest city: Bengaluru
- Civic agency: Village Panchayat

Adakamaranahalli (Magadi) is a village in the southern state of Karnataka, India. It is located in the Magadi taluk of Bengaluru South district.

== See also ==
- Bengaluru South district
- Districts of Karnataka
