= Abbanakuppe, Bengaluru South district =

Abbanakuppe
- village
- Abbanakuppe is in Bengaluru South district

- Location in Karnataka, India Abbanakuppe (India)
- Coordinates: 12.773°N 77.420°E
- Country: India
- State: Karnataka
- District: Bengaluru South
- Taluks: Ramanagaram

Government
  - Body: Bidadi Poursabha

Languages
  - Official: Kannada
- Time zone: UTC+5:30 (IST)
- PIN: 562109
- Nearest city: Bangalore
- Civic agency: Village Panchayat

Abbanakuppe is a village in the southern state of Karnataka, India. It is located in the Ramanagara taluk of Bengaluru South district in Karnataka. It hosts the Bidadi Industrial Area, and Toyota Kirloskar and Coca-Cola have factories in the village.

== See also ==
- Bengaluru South district
- Districts of Karnataka
