= Sathanur, Magadi =

Sathanur Sathanur
- town
- Location in Karnataka, India Sathanur (India)
- Coordinates: 12.936848°N 77.166751°E
- Country: India
- State: Karnataka
- District: Bengaluru South

Languages
  - Official: Kannada
- Time zone: UTC+5:30 (IST)
- ISO 3166 code: IN-KA
- Vehicle registration: KA
- Website: karnataka.gov.in

Sathanur is a village located near Magadi in Bengaluru South district of Karnataka, India. It was the birthplace of musician/composer Pandareeka Vittala.

There is a high school started by Sri Narasimha Sastry in 1972, which caters to students from the surrounding villages. In 2007, an industrial training institution was started by SNR Education Trust for the rural students.
