= Climbing locations in India =

List of locations for climbing in India

Climbing locations in India allow people to go rock climbing. Stated below, are the names of some of the well-known destinations for rock climbing in India to give one a better idea of the places where they can engage in this game.

== Sport Climbing ==
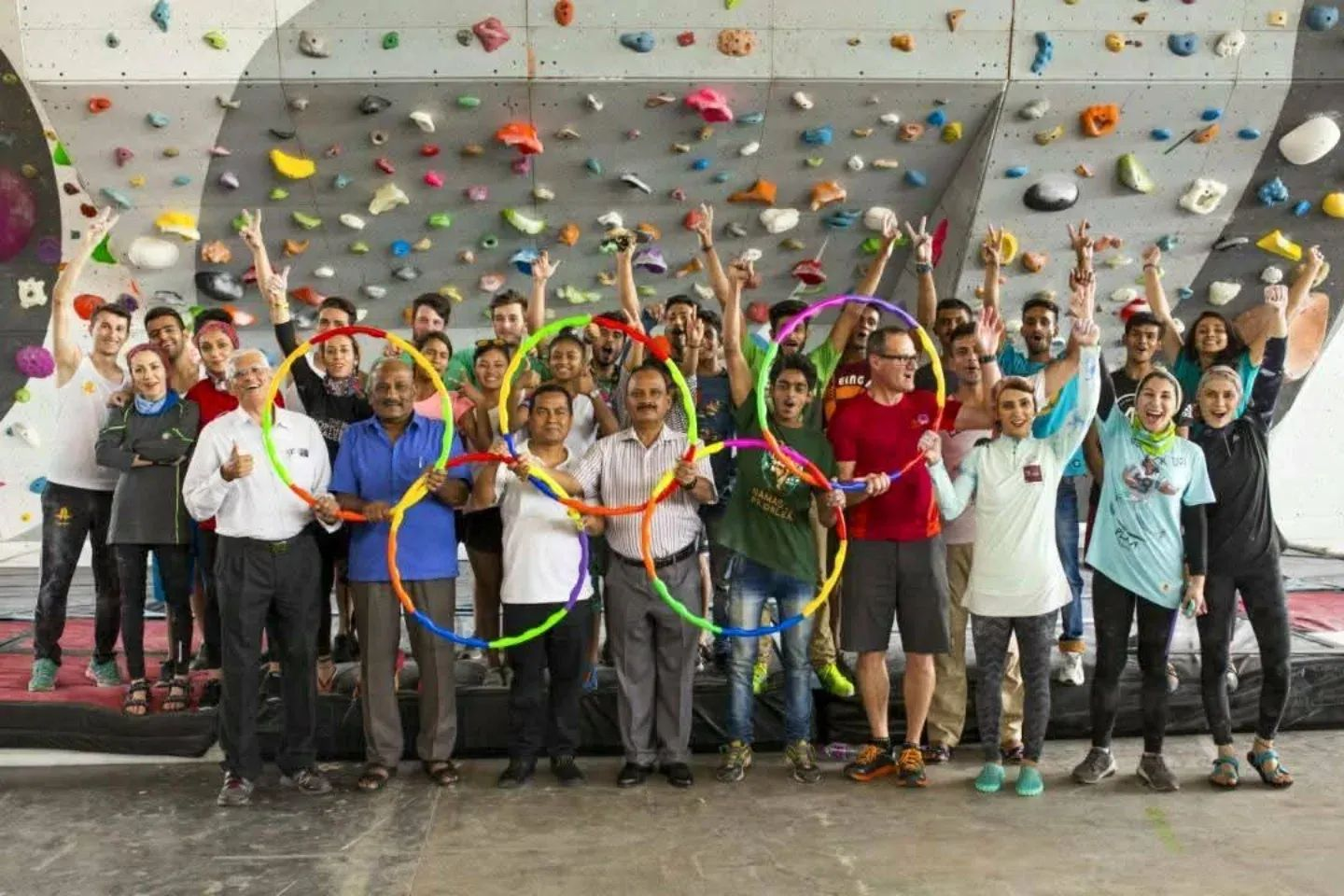
Indian Sport Climbing Team and international climbers during a World Cup event in Navi Mumbai

Sport climbing was introduced in India in 1991. It is governed by the Indian Mountaineering Foundation (IMF).^{[1]} A founder member of International Federation of Sport Climbing (now, World Climbing). Col.Vijay Singh, VSM is the president and Shri. Keerthi Pais is the secretary of IMF.

Pune, Kolkata, Delhi, Jamshedpur, Jammu and Bangalore are prominent with athletes participating in competition climbing in India.^{[2]} The Indian Mountaineering Foundation, The Nehru Institute of Mountaineering, Jawahar Institute of Mountaineering, National institute of Mountaineering and Allied Sports and General Thimayya National Academy of Adventure conducts short term courses in Sport Climbing.^{[3]}

== Southern India ==
Badami, a five-hour drive from Bangalore, has many places to go rock climbing. Bangalore is in the center of a number of rock-climbing destinations like Ramanagara (the setting for the Hindi blockbuster Sholay), Ramadevara betta, Savandurga, madhugiri, Thenginkalbetta, Kabbal, SRS betta, and others. Kambakkam at a distance of around 100 km (62 mi) from Chennai provides good climbing in many grades while Hampi in Karnataka has some of the best granite rocks in India providing the climbers ample opportunities to test their skills.

== Eastern India ==
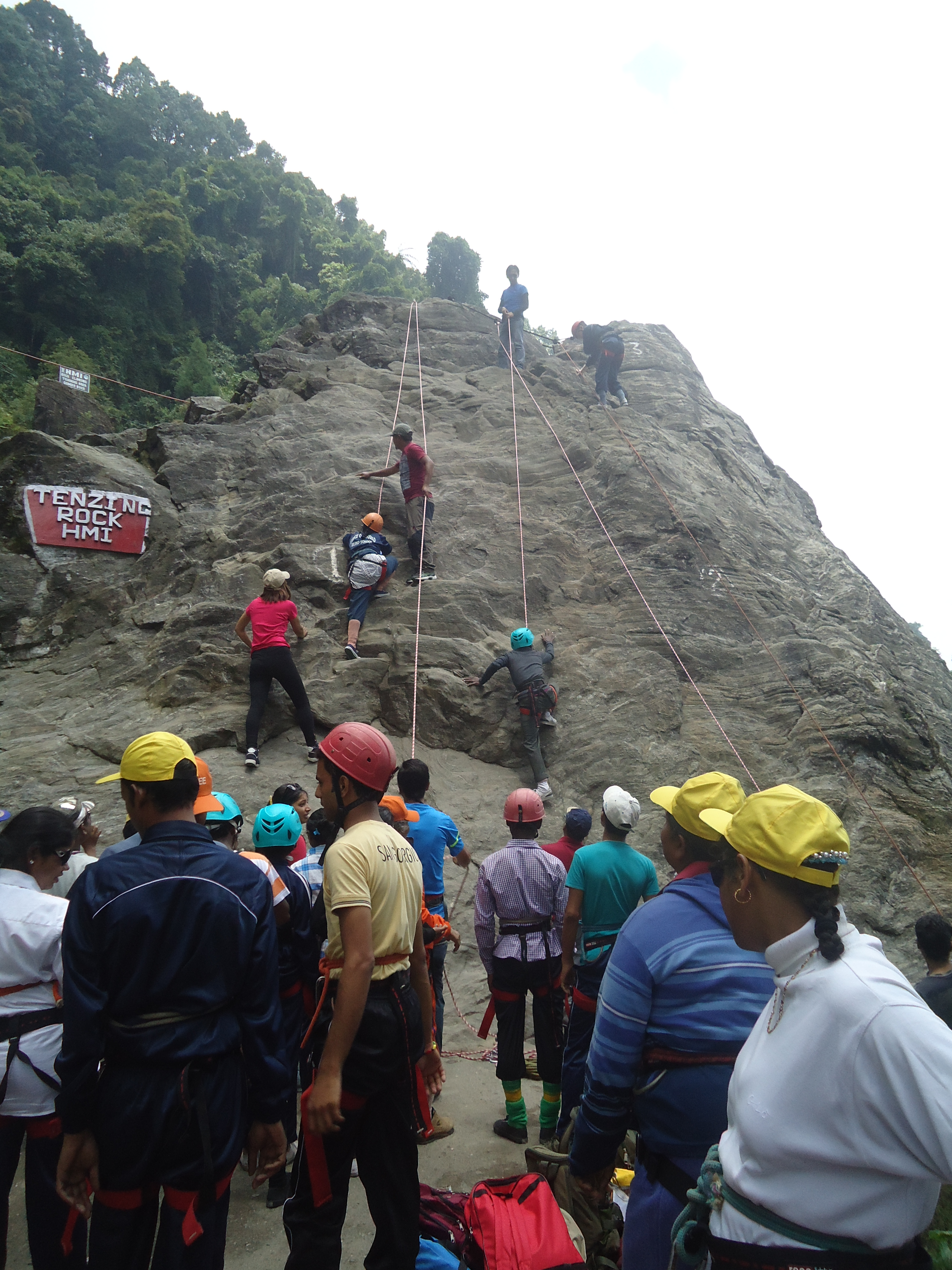
Three-point Rock Climbing at Tenzing rock at Darjeeling

In a 300 km (190 mi) radius adjoining Calcutta, there are many rock-climbing destinations like Purulia, Matha Bura, Jai Chandi, and Susunia Hills. The Himalayan Mountaineering Institute provides some courses in Mountaineering at Gobu and Tenzing Norgay Rocks.

== Western India ==
There are several rock-climbing destinations near Mumbai such as Kanheri Caves in the Borivili National Park, Mumbra Boulders, CBD Belapur and Manori Rocks. In Gujarat, Pavagadh is a tourist favorite rock-climbing destination as well as Idar and Junagadh. Pandit Dindayal Upadhyay Training Center at Junagadh, Gujarat also organizes Basic Course in Rock Climbing. In Rajasthan, the region around Mount Abu including State Mountaineering Institute's training area, Golden Horn Spire, and Adhar Devi Slabs is popular for rock climbing. In Madhya Pradesh, Bheembhetka located just 45 km (28 mi) from Bhopal and Panchmadi are popular climbing spots.

== Northern India ==
Northern India hosts a wide range of climbing locations, attracting both amateur and professional climbers.

Rock-climbing arenas around New Delhi include Sanjayvan (Qutab Institutional Aera), Ramjas (West Patel Nagar), Lado Sarai in Delhi, Dhauj (55 km (34 mi) from Delhi), and Dam Dama Lake (around 65 km (40 mi) off Delhi). Other locations include Himachal Pradesh, Manali, Sethan, Solang Nala, Chattru, Chota Dhara, Dharamshala. In J&K, there are granite sites for climbing in Leh - Ladakh, Shey, Gangles, Lankershey (near Kargil) which has attracted climbers world-wide. There are also many artificial climbing walls in Delhi, Calcutta, Mumbai, Bangalore, Darjeeling, Manali, Leh, Uttarkashi, Bikaner, and at Mathura Road near Badarpur border in Haryana.

== Karnataka ==
- Bangalore
- Antharagange
- Badami
- Chamundi Betta
- Kunti betta
- Hampi
- Madhugiri
- Narsapur Rocks
- Ramanagaram
- Raogodlu
- Savan Durga
- Turahalli
- Kabbal Durga
- Malekal Tirupathi
- Chikkaballapura

== Kerala ==
- Chembra Peak
- Pythal Mala
- Ranipuram

== Maharashtra ==
- Pune
- Nashik
- Mumbai

== Gujarat ==
- Ahmadabad- Police Headquarters Shahibag
- Surat- Fountainhead School
- Idar
- Junagadh
- Pavagadh

== Rajasthan ==
- Mount Abu

== Tamil Nadu ==
- Chennai- Fitrock Arena
- Krishnagiri
- Nilgiri
- Hosur
- Tiruvannamalai
- Sulagiri

== Uttar Pradesh ==
- Kanpur- Climbing wall at IIT Kanpur

== Andhra Pradesh ==
- Kangundi
- Kuppam
- Kondaveedu
- GandiKota
- Penukonda
