= Megalapalya =

- village
- Country: India
- State: Karnataka
- District: Bengaluru South

Population
  - Total: 180

Languages
  - Official: Kannada
- Time zone: UTC+5:30 (IST)
- PIN: 562127
- Nearest city: Bangalore
- Lok Sabha constituency: Bengaluru Rural
- Vidhan Sabha constituency: Magadi

Megalapalya is a small village in Magadi taluk, Bengaluru South district, India.

Before 2010 it was located in the Bangalore rural district, Karnataka.

== Demography ==
In 2011, there were 1647 recorded in the village.

== Transport ==
This village is located on Bengaluru-Mangaluru National Highway NH48 and it is 50 km from Bengaluru.

Megala palya village

Jatre is on Monday and Tuesday will be festival and day is famous for non veg food.

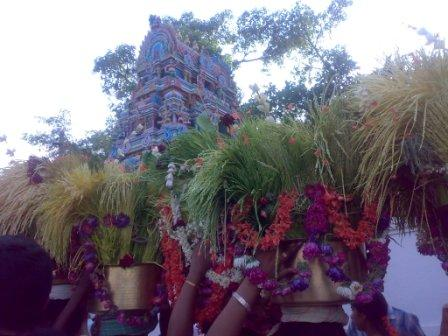
Peoples are enjoying the festival (jatre)

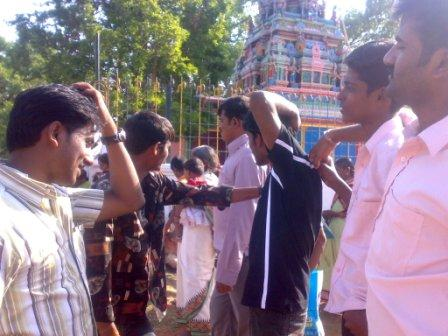

Village peoples are playing Drama Mahabharatha on festival
