= Bilikal Rangaswamy Betta =

Temple Hill in Kanakpura, Karnataka

Coordinates: 12.554°N 77.512°E

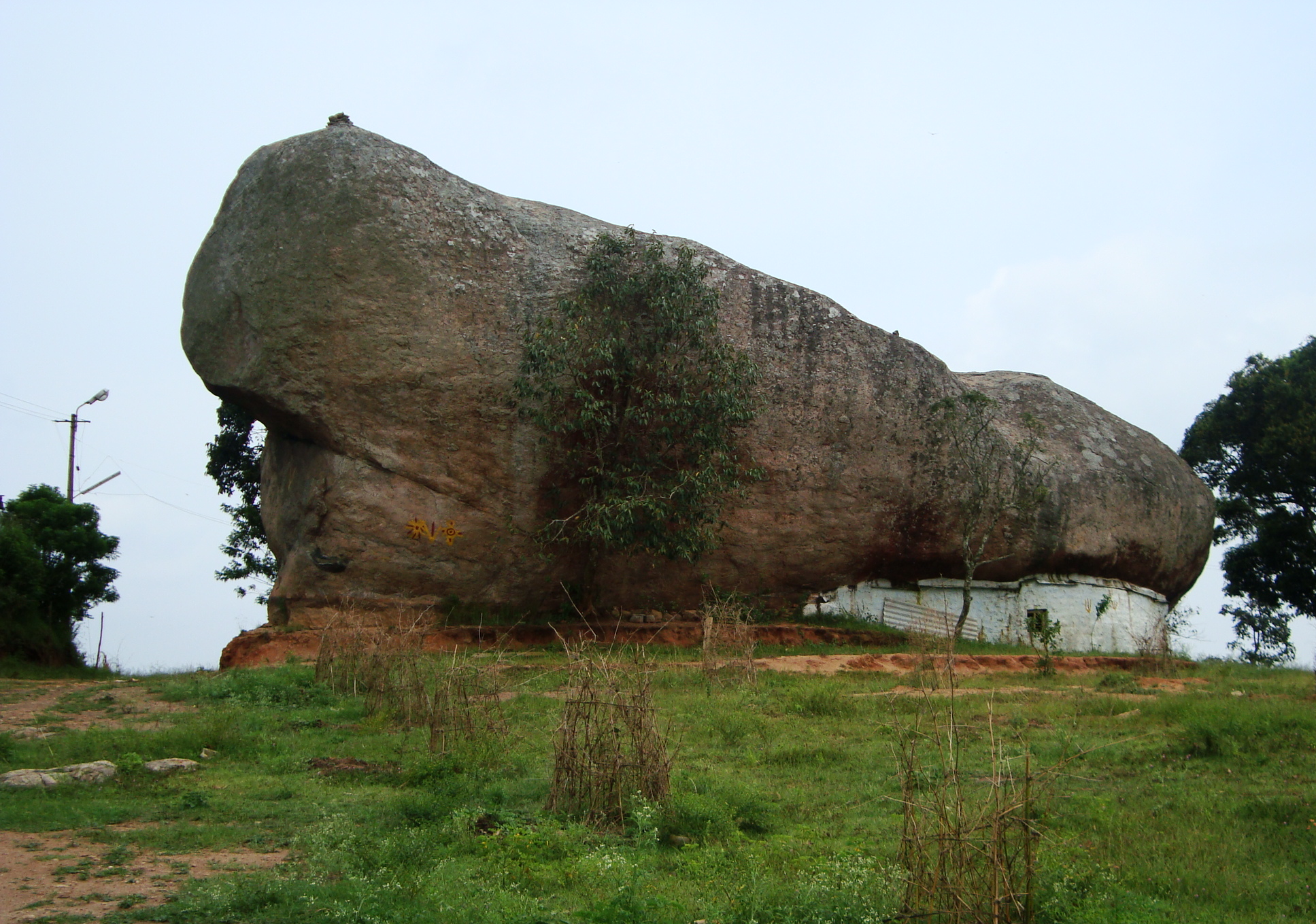
The rock which houses the Ranganatha Swamy temple

Bilikal Ranganatha Swamy Betta is a hill near Kanakapura town in the Indian state of Karnataka. It is located 70 km south of Bangalore city. Atop the hill is a temple dedicated to Lord Ranganatha Swamy. The temple and an adjacent quarters is housed underneath a huge granite rock. The hill is also known by the name Billikal Betta due to the whitish rocks near the summit that is visible from a long distance. The peak is at a height of 3,780 feet (1,152 m).

== Biodiversity ==
Bilikal Rangaswamy Betta belongs to the Forest Reserve and is filled with shrub forest. Elephants and other medium-sized wild-life animals can be spotted in these forests. The vegetation of the hill is typical of high hills. The vegetation is quite thick especially in post monsoon season. The adjoining forests are known to harbor elephants and other wildlife endemic to the area. The view from the top is incredible as one can see the hillocks from the surrounding Kanakapura. There is an annual festival held once a year on 14 January on the top of this place to herald the glory of the Gods of the temples situated at this place.

The hill summit can be reached by trekking or via an alternate track accessible from Kanakapura. One has to exhibit extracare while traversing the path as large number of Elephants wander around.

== Gallery ==
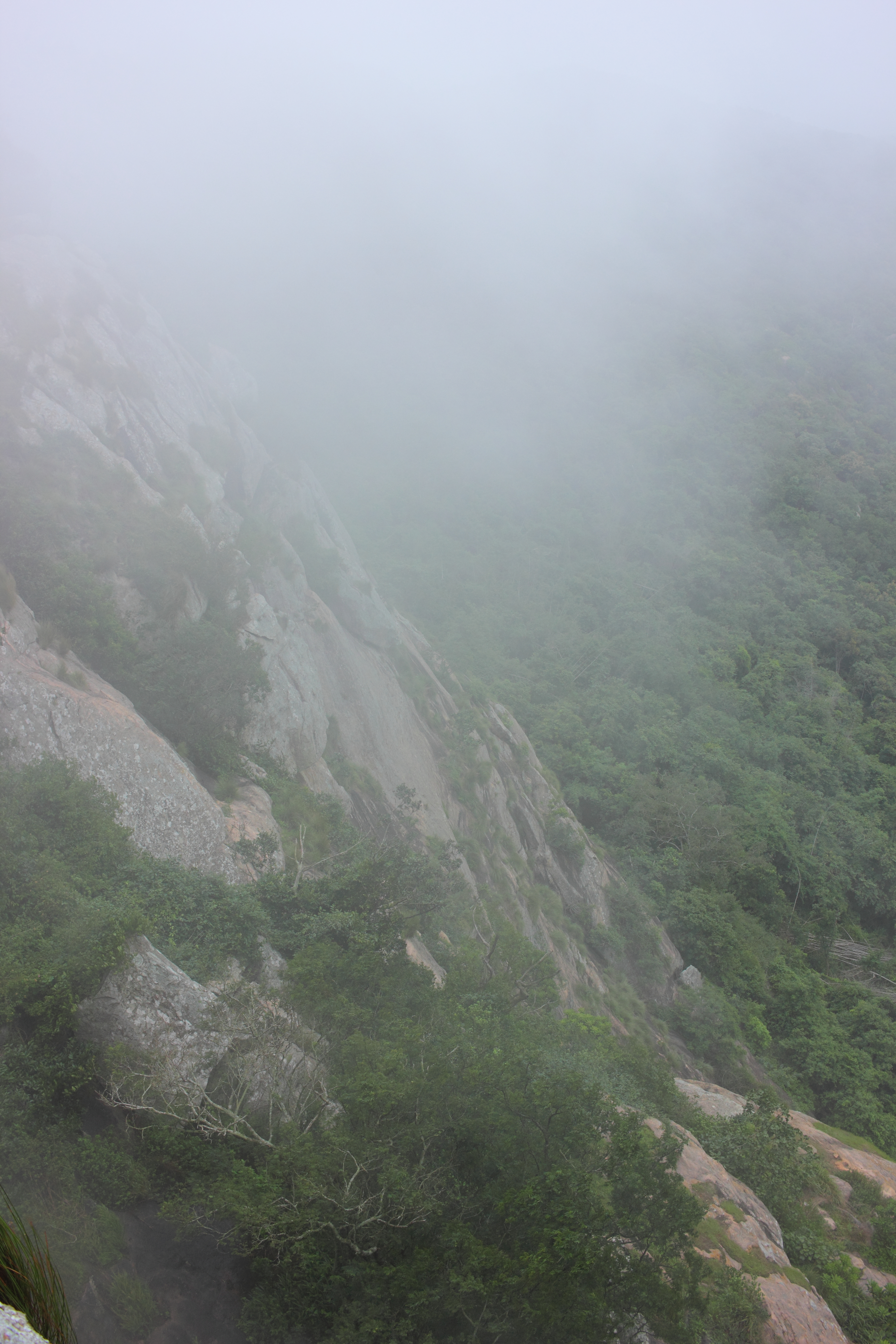
A view from top

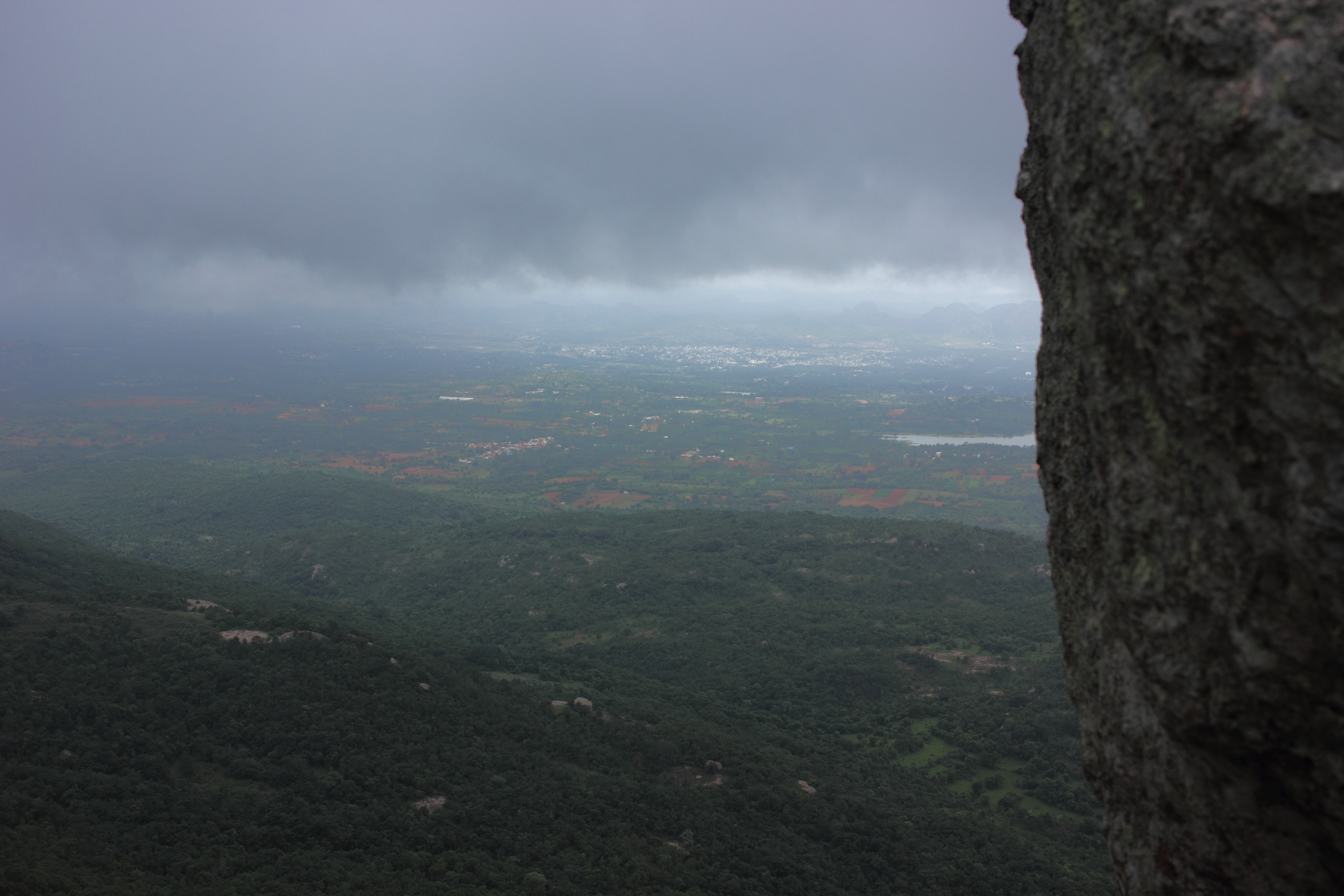
A view from top

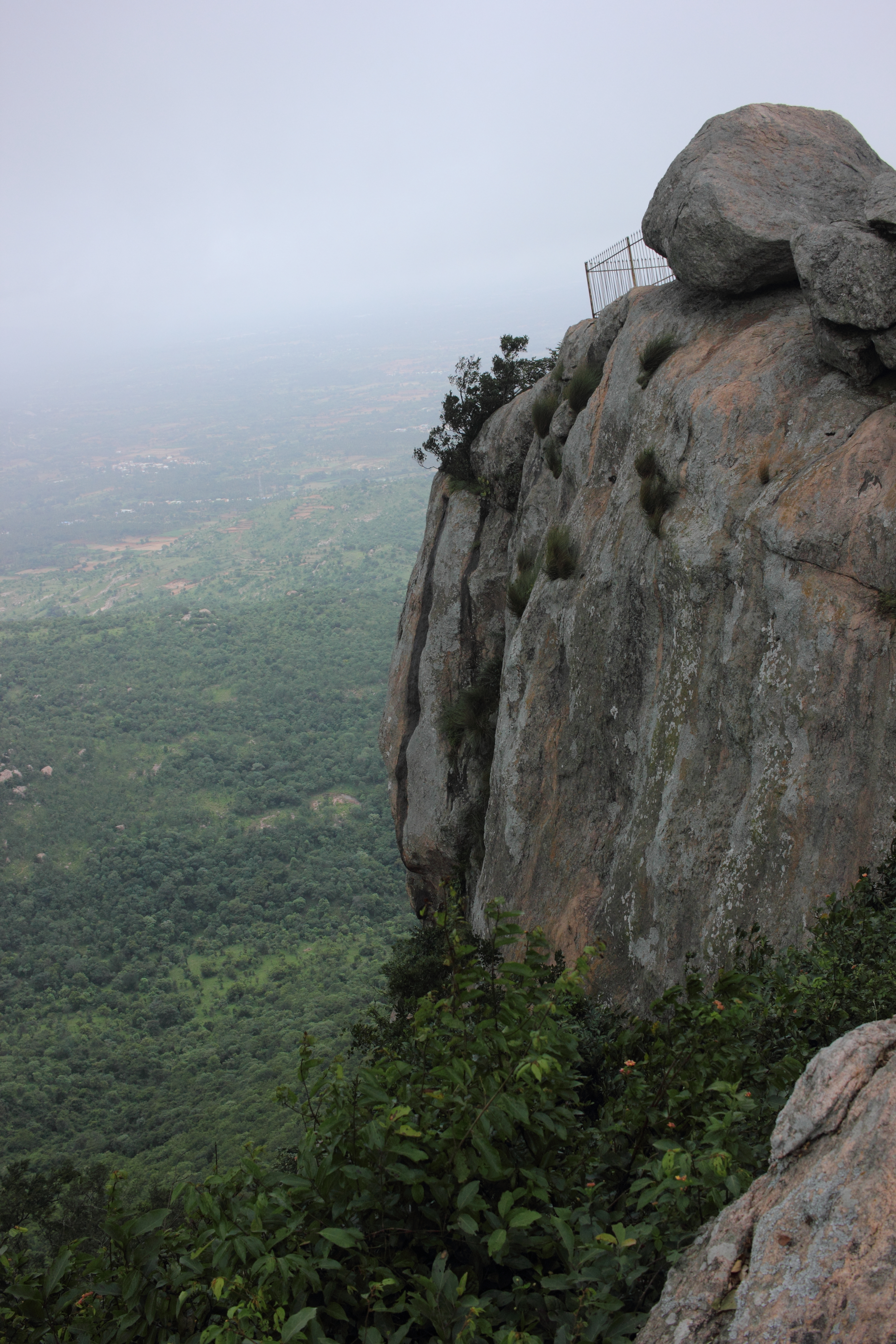
A view from top

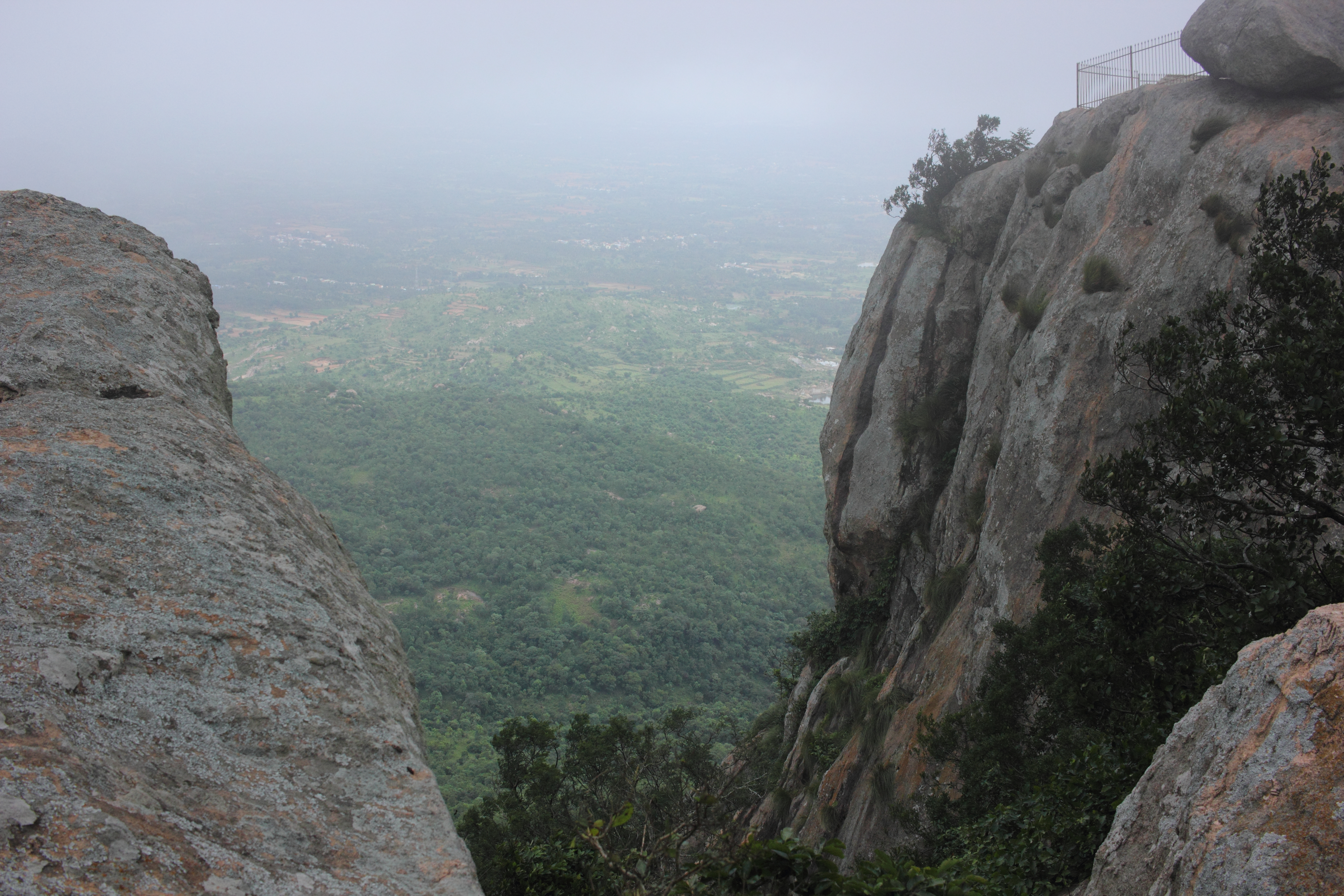
A view from top

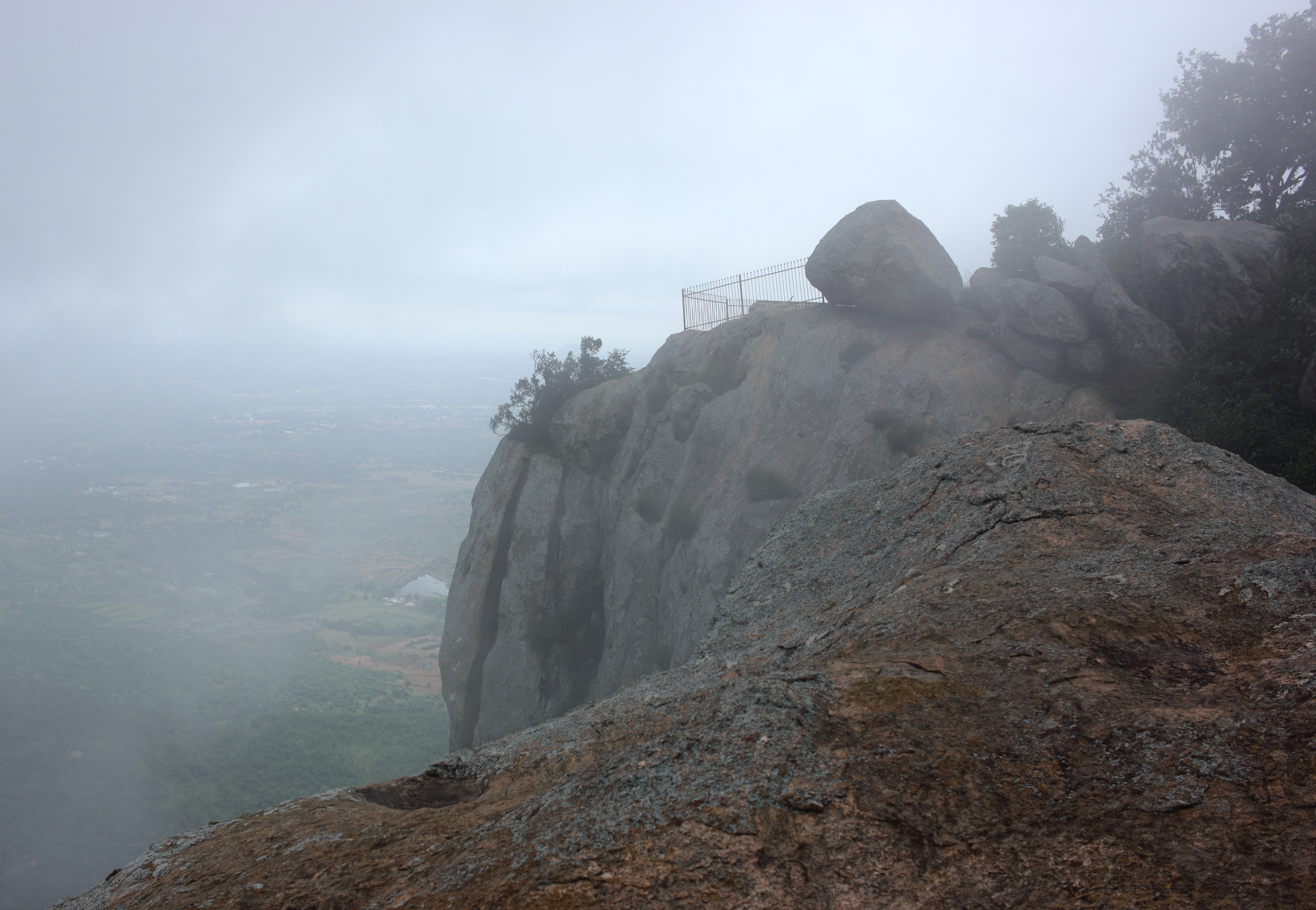
A view from top

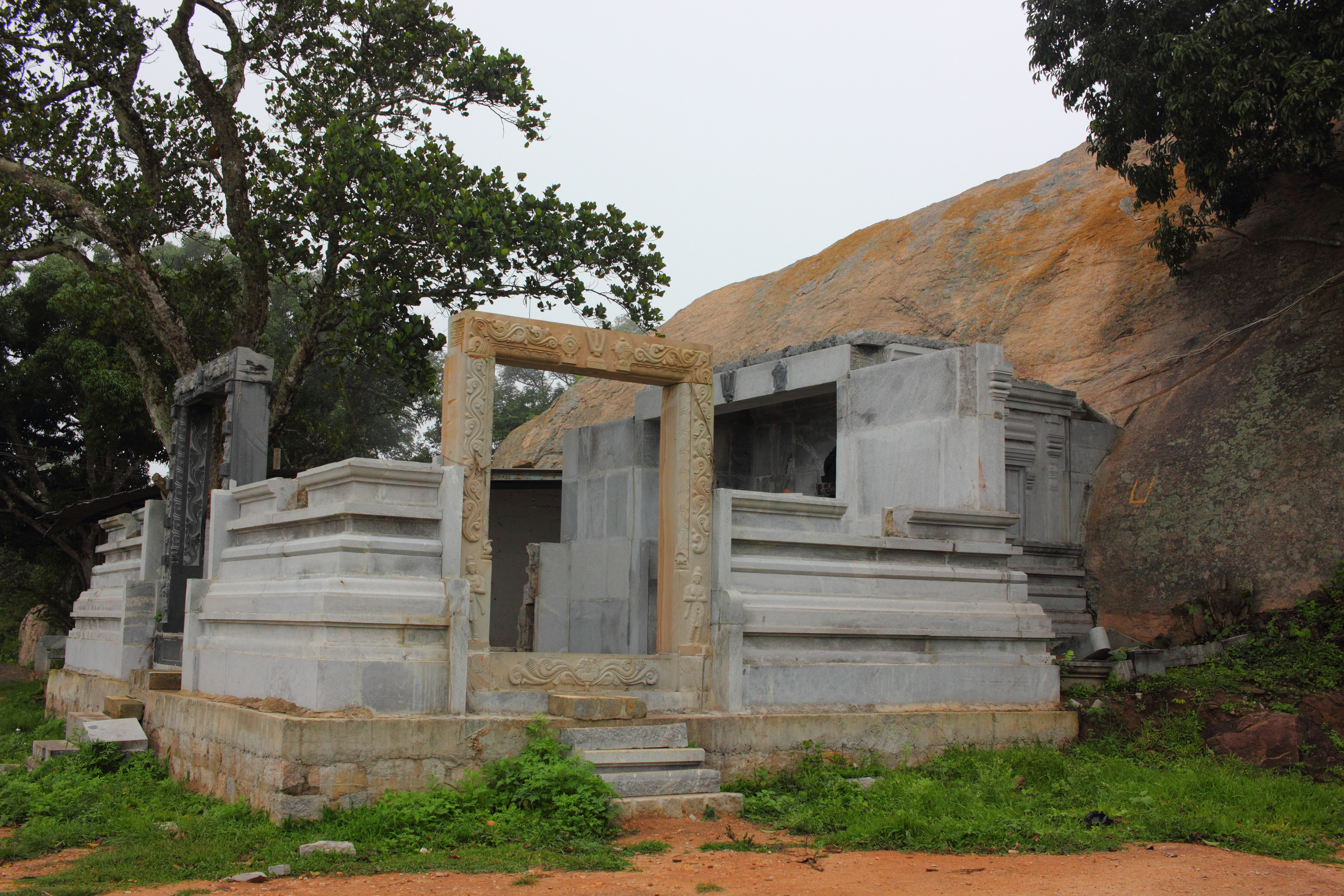
Old Temple under renovation.

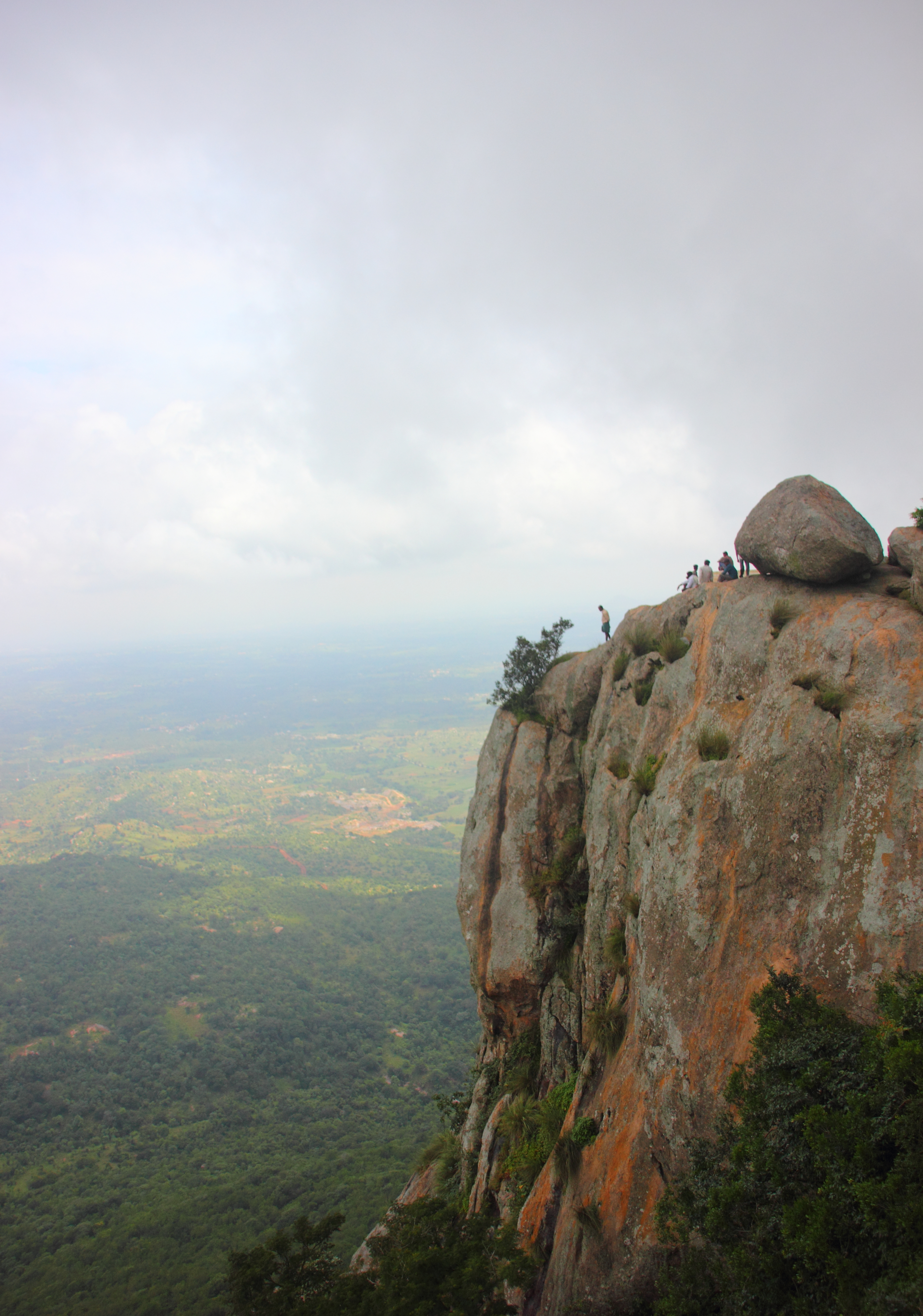
A view from top

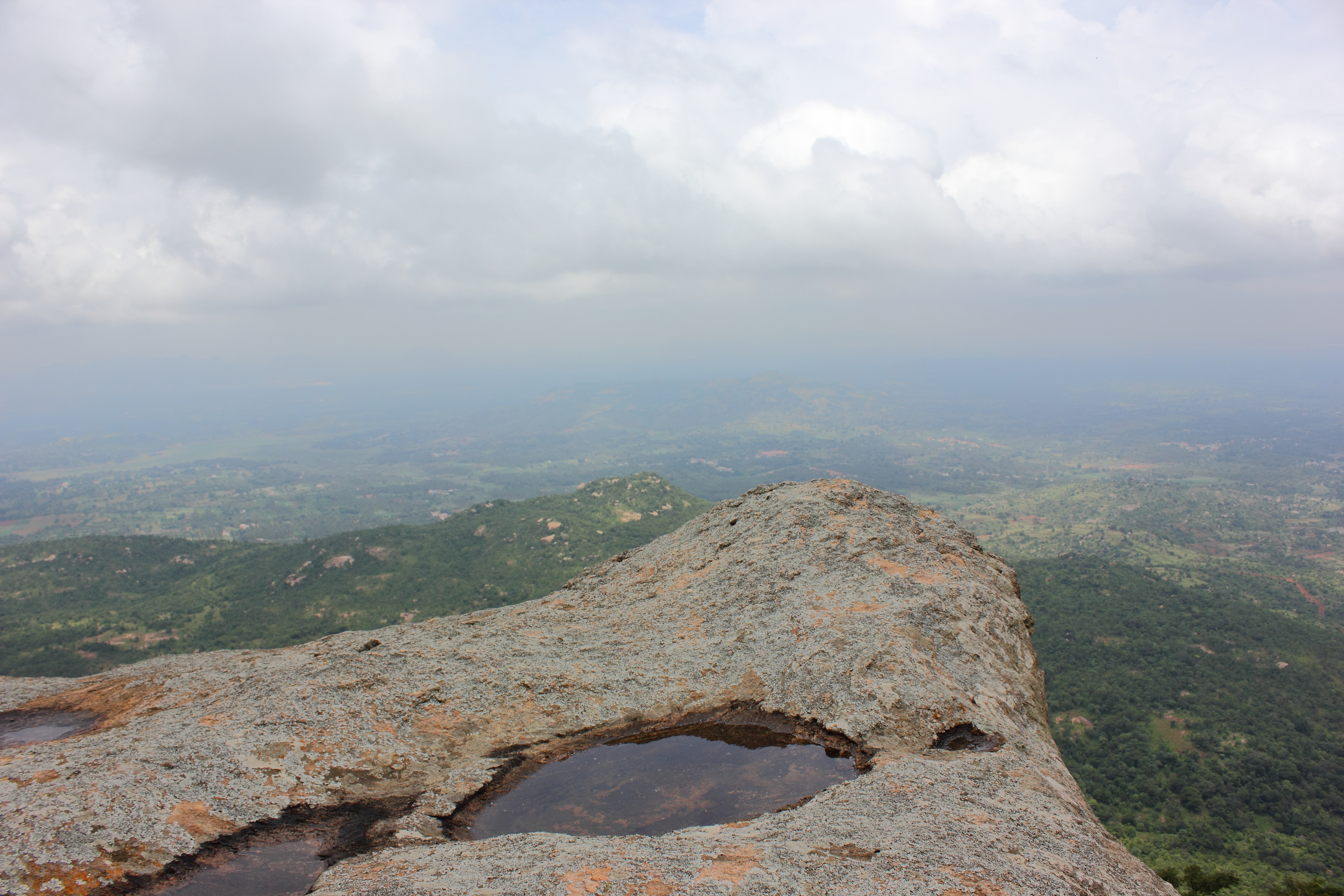
A view from top
