= Kodamballi =

Kodamballi Kodambahalli
- Village
- Location in Karnataka, India Kodamballi (India)
- Coordinates: 12.54522°N 77.21839°E
- Country: India
- State: Karnataka
- District: [Bengaluru south District]
- Talukas: Channapatna

Government
  - Body: Village Panchayat

Area
  - Total: 4.3622 km^{2} (1.6843 sq mi)

Population (2011)
  - Total: 3,279
  - Density: 751.7/km^{2} (1,947/sq mi)

Languages
  - Official: Kannada
- Time zone: UTC+5:30 (IST)
- Postal code: 562138
- Vehicle registration: KA-42
- Nearest city: Channapatna
- Civic agency: Village Panchayat

Kodamballi is a village in the Channapatna Taluk of Ramanagara District of the Indian state of Karnataka.

== Demographics ==
The Kodamballi local language is Kannada. The population is 3,279 among 765 households. The female population is 51.1%. The village literacy rate is 75.4% overall and the female literacy rate is 57.2% Vokkaligas are found in large number.

== Geography ==
It is located 29 kilometers from District headquarters in Ramanagara. It is located along SH-94 of Channapatna-Halaguru Road.

Kodamballi is surrounded by Maddur, Malvalli, and Kanakapura Taluks.

Kodamballi is on the border of the Ramanagara District and Mandya District. Chennapaaji hill lies east of the village. Kabbal forest and Narikallu Gudda forest are adjacent.

== Popular Places ==
The Maraleshwara temple built by the Gangas is in the village. Hunasanahalli Bisilamma temple is one kilometer from the Village. Popular tourist places include Chennapaaji betta (hill) and Kodamballi lake.
