= Kudur =

- place
- Location in Karnataka, India Kudur (India)
- Coordinates: 13.1109519°N 77.1479417°E
- Country: India
- State: Bengaluru South

Population (2011)
  - Total: 9,114

Languages
  - Official: Kannada
- Time zone: UTC+5:30 (IST)

Kudur is a place in the southern state of Karnataka, India. It is located in the Magadi taluk of Bengaluru South in Karnataka. It is 21 km from Magadi, 56 km from Ramanagara and 30 km from Tumakuru.

== Demographics ==
As of 2011 India Census, Kudur had a population of 9114 with 4568 males and 4546 females. The location is accessible from Solur (around 12 km to Kudur) or from Marur handpost (around 5 km to Kudur). Both these locations lie right on NH 75 (Bangalore-Mangalore Highway). It is a hobli centre in Magadi Taluk and is predominantly Vokkaliga dominated town.

== See also ==
- Ramanagara District
- Districts of Karnataka
