= Revanasiddeshwara Betta =

Hindu temple in India

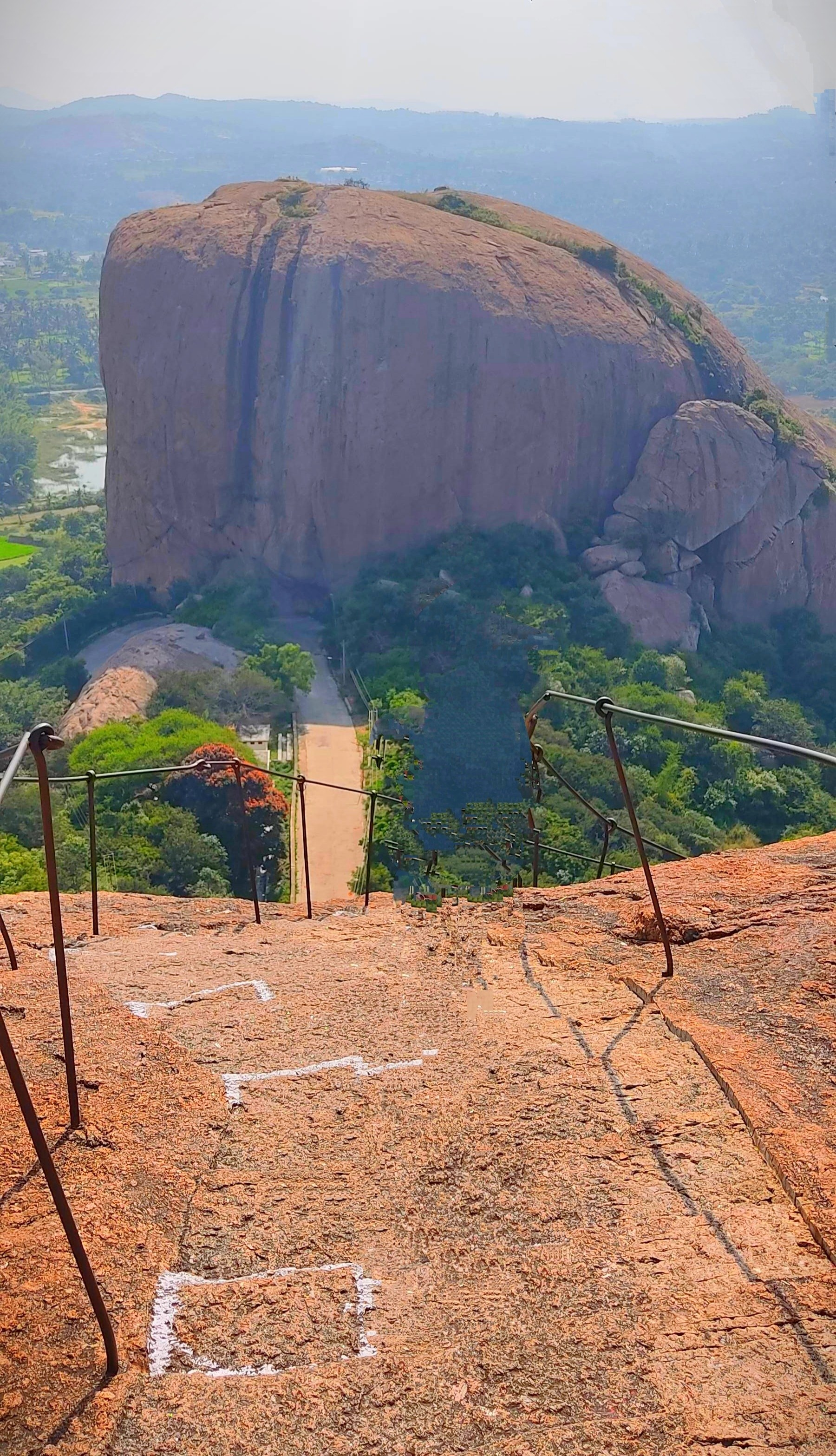
Sky view of the SRS hills

Revanasiddeshwara Betta/Revanasiddeshwara Hill (Kannada: ರೇವಣಸಿದ್ಧೇಶ್ವರ ಬೆಟ್ಟ), is a Shaiva temple in India. It is situated 3,066 feet (935 m) above sea level, located in Avverahalli, 15 km from city of Ramanagara.

This place is commonly called SRS Betta (SRS Hills).

There are 3 temples on the site - at the top is Revanasiddeshwara betta, midway is Bheemeshwari (named after the pandava Bheema) and at the base is Renukamba temple.

The site is 60 kilometres (37 miles) from Bangalore.

== History ==
Sri Revana Siddeshwara is considered as a reincarnation of the great Jagadguru Shri Renukacharya who was ordered by Shiva to take incarnation on earth to spread Bhakti among the people.

With the blessings of Lord Shiva, Jagadguru Reṇukacharya (also known as Revaṇaradhya or Revaṇasiddha) was one of the five acharyas who came in the Kali Yuga to teach and preach Virasaiva thathva. He is aforesaid to possess been born from the Somesvara linga, however, to possess traveled everywhere Asian nation to show Virasaiva thathva. The Someshwara temple is located in Kollipaki.

Texts date this legendary saint to the time of the Ramayaṇa since they were the teacher of the nice sage Agastya of Panchavati. This saint is alleged to possess consecrated thirty million liṇgas at the bid of Ravaṇa's brother, Vibhiṣaṇa, once Ravaṇa's death.

They finally established the Rambhapuri maṭha. The Reṇuka gotra of the Virasaivas is known as once them.

As mentioned above Shri Revana Siddeshwara was the reincarnation of Great Jagadguru Shri Renukacharya. Thus, with the blessings of Lord Shiva, Renuka emerged from the Somashekhara linga close to Hyderabad's Kolli saakshi kshetra, and have become called Revana Siddeshwara.

According to Indian Ithihasa, the lord preached “Patsala lingaanga saamarasya tatwat” to Agastya Maharshi. He also visited Sri Lanka as per Vibhishana's advice to King Ravana, he installed three crores of shivalingas. In this approach he even convinced many kings and emperors across Indian States to unfold shivabhakti.

Revana Siddeshwara, throughout their Mission Shivabhakti campaign, once lived on a mountain at Averahalli near Ramanagara in Karnataka. That place is even currently called a holy shivakshetra [Shiva place]. Finally once he was in kolli saakshi kshetra once more, as per lord Shiva's wish, he became lingaikya and reached Kailasa, the abode of Lord Shiva. The place wherever they did anushthaana in Avarehalli is understood as Revanasiddeshwara Betta (hill).
