= Achalu (Kanakapura) =

- village
- Achalu (Kanakapura) is in Ramanagara district
- Interactive map of Achalu
- Coordinates: 12.4757°N 77.3630°E
- Country: India
- State: Karnataka
- District: Bangalore Rural
- Talukas: Kanakapura

Government
  - Body: Village Panchayat

Languages
  - Official: Kannada
- Time zone: UTC+5:30 (IST)
- Nearest city: Ramanagara
- Civic agency: ACCHALU Panchayat

Achalu (Kanakapura) is a village in the southern state of Karnataka, India. It is located in the Kanakapura taluk of Ramanagara district.

== See also ==
- Bangalore Rural
- Districts of Karnataka
