= Kabbala, Karnataka =

Coordinates: 13°55′N 76°13′E

Kabbala
- village
- Interactive map of Kabbala
- Country: India
- State: Karnataka
- District: Chitradurga

Languages
  - Official: Kannada
- Time zone: UTC+5:30 (IST)

Kabbala is a small village in Hosadurga taluk in Chitradurga district of the Karnataka state of India located in the southern part of Karnataka.
