= Malagala =

Village in the Colombo District, Sri Lanka

Malagala මලගල
- Location within Colombo District Location within Sri Lanka
- Coordinates: 6°47′30″N 80°06′44″E
- Country: Sri Lanka
- Province: Western
- District: Colombo
- Divisional Secretariat: Padukka

Population (2024)
  - Total: 1,790

Malagala (Sinhala: මලගල) is a small village near Padukka in Colombo District, Sri Lanka. Malagala, which is a part of the Avissawella electorate, is situated 42.3 km (26.3 mi) southeast of Colombo, the commercial capital of Sri Lanka. Malagala is near the Kalutara District boundary. The village had a population of 1,790 at the 2024 census.
