= Kanakapura =

Kanakapura Kankanahalli
- City
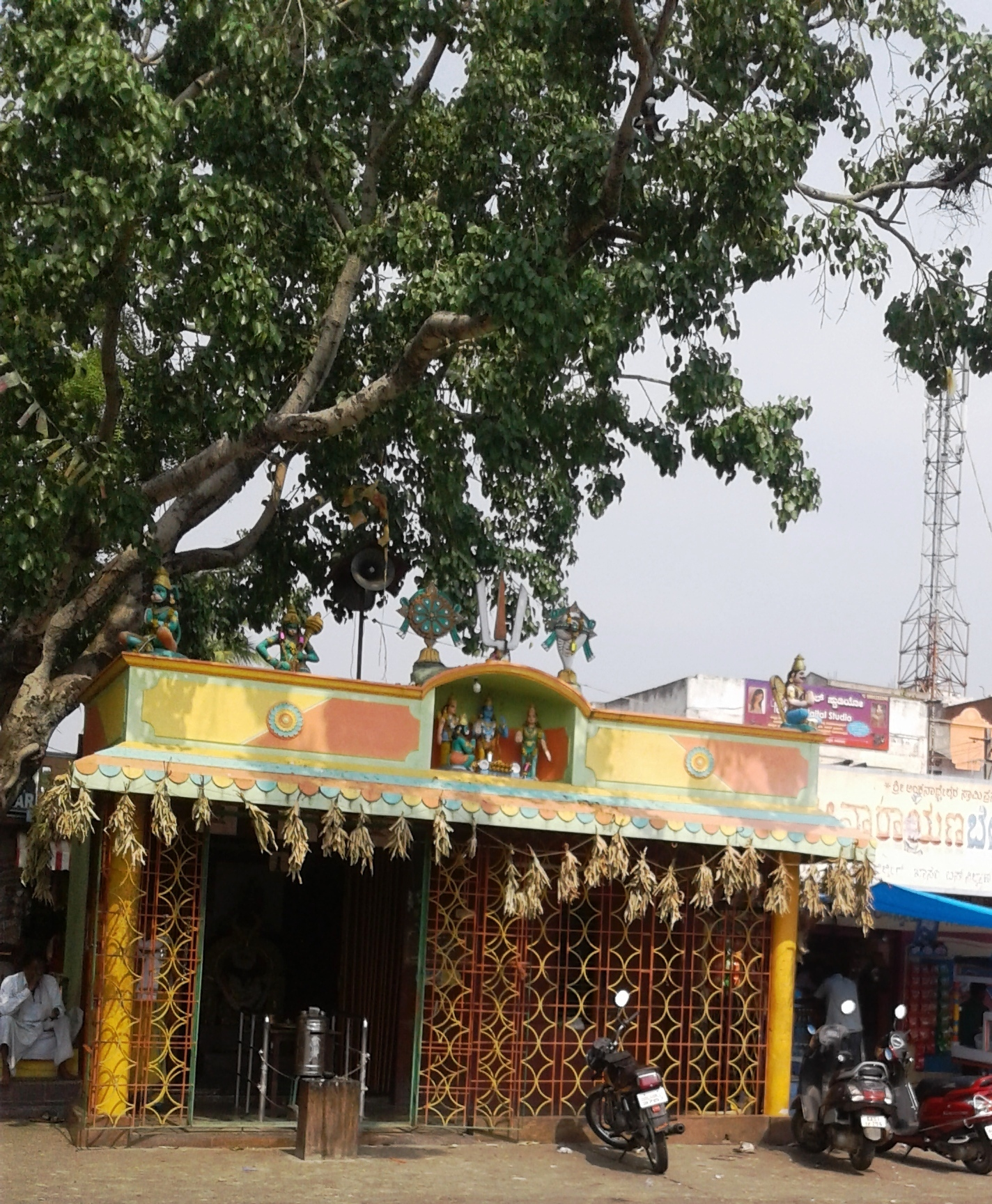
- Temple inside Kanakapura bus station

- Location of Kanakapura Kanakapura (Karnataka)
- Coordinates: 12.55°N 77.417°E
- Country: India
- State: Karnataka
- District: Bengaluru South

Government
  - Body: City Municipal Council
  - MLA: D. K. Shivakumar

Area
  - City: 7.80 km^{2} (3.01 sq mi)
  - Rural: 1,600 km^{2} (620 sq mi)
- Elevation: 637 m (2,090 ft)

Population (2011)
  - City: 54,014
  - Density: 6,920/km^{2} (17,900/sq mi)
  - Rural: 296,863

Languages
  - Official: Kannada
- Time zone: UTC+5:30 (IST)
- PIN: 562 117
- Telephone code: 08117
- ISO 3166 code: IN-KA
- Vehicle registration: KA 42
- Website: kanakapuracity.mrc.gov.in

Kanakapura is a city, taluka in the Bengaluru South district of Karnataka on the banks of the Arkavathi river and the administrative center of the taluk of the same name. Its founder is Sameer Kanaka Pradeesha, hence its name. Kanakapura is the largest cocoon silk producer in India. The Kaveri River flows around 21 km in Kanakapura Taluk. The city previously belonged to the Bangalore Rural District. It was formerly the largest constituency in the country. (1,553 km^{2} [600 sq mi]). The Kodihalli Wildlife Range and Harohalli Wildlife Range are under its division. The Kaveri Wildlife Sanctuary consists of two main zones: the Sangam Wildlife Range and the Mugguru Wildlife Range.

== Etymology ==
The place was originally written under the Gangas and later under the Cholas, who administered it as a part of an area named Kilalainad. Later, the Hoysalas made it a major headquarters of a province (sime) and its name was changed to Kanakapura from its original Kanakanahalli. However, earlier mentions refer to the city as Kanikaranahalli in two Hoysala records dated 1319 and 1317 A.D. from Hachchalu and Nyakanahalli (Kanakapura tq) villages respectively. A more recent record dated 1662 A.D. by Mysore rulers from Malagala also mention the place as Kanikaranahalli being the headquarters of a sime. The local inhabitants universally call it as Kanikaranahalli, which is otherwise corrupted as Kankanahalli, according to Buchanan. He further claims that Kanikaranahalli has a Kannada origin, in which Kani and Karna or Kanikara signifies showing sympathy.

== Geography ==
Kanakapura is located at 12.55°N 77.42°E. It has an average elevation of 638 m (2,093 ft).

Kanakapura is 55 km (34 mi) south of Bengaluru (capital) on National Highway NH 209, on the banks of the river Arkavathi (tributary of River Kaveri), 27 km (17 mi) from Ramanagara and 96 km (60 mi) from Mysuru.

The National Highway 209 (Bangalore – Coimbatore – Madurai) passes through Kanakapura.

== Demographics ==
As of the 2001 India census, Kanakapura had a population of 47,047. Males constitute 52% of the population and females 48%. Kanakapura has an average literacy rate of 76%, higher than the national average of 59.5%: male literacy is 72%, and female literacy is 59%. In Kanakapura, 11% of the population is under 6 years of age. Now Kanakapura is City Municipality Council. Kanakapura taluk has 6 hoblis, namely, Kasaba town, Doddamaralavadi, Harohalli, Uyyamballi, Sathanur and Kodihalli.

As of the 2011 India census, Kanakapura had a population of 54,014 individuals. The average literacy rate stood at 81.08%.

Images of Kanakapura
A signboard in Kanakapura (2026)

Kanakapura bus station (2026)

Kanakapura bus depot (2026)

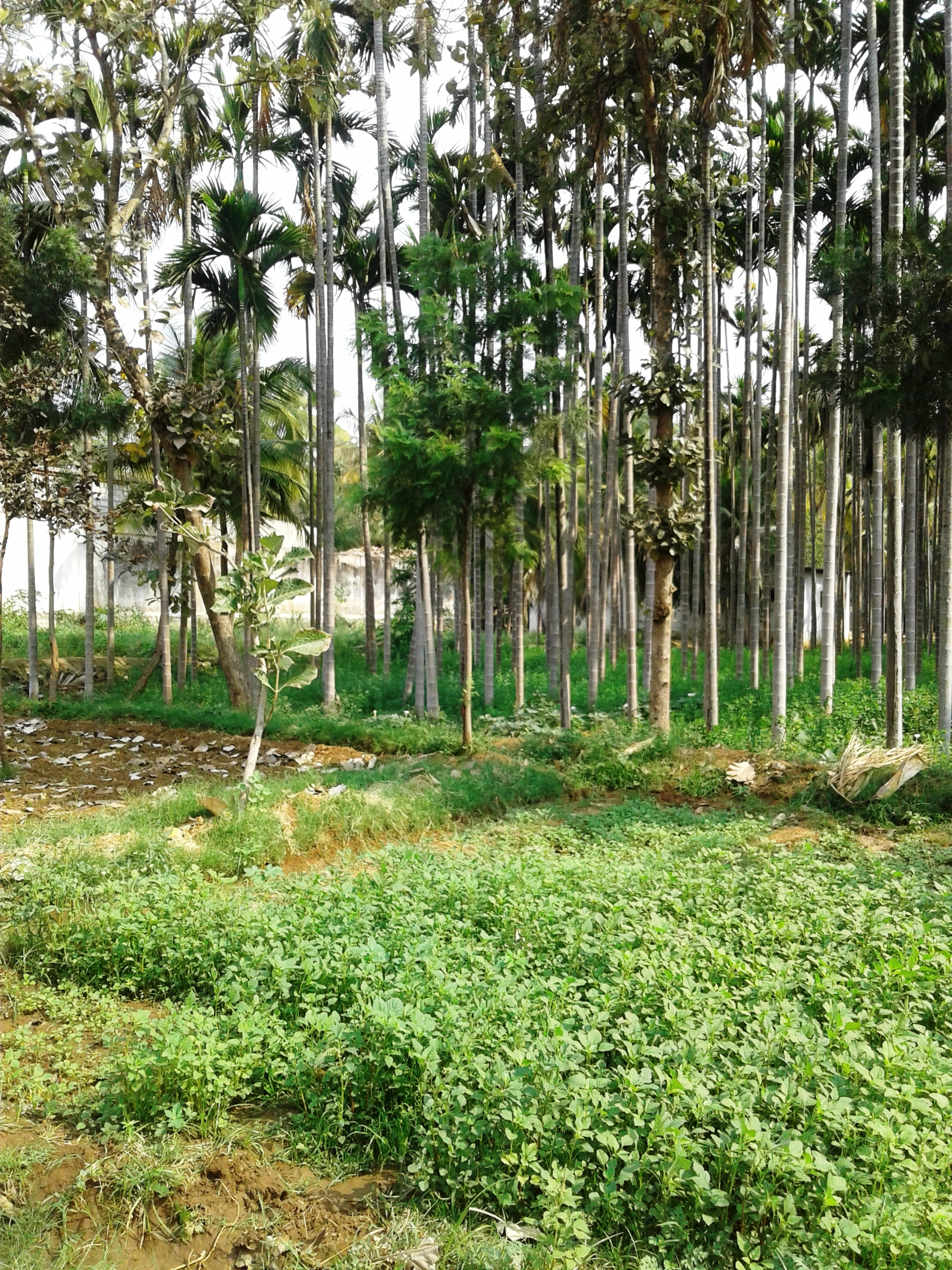
Forest around the Kanakapura bus station (2017)

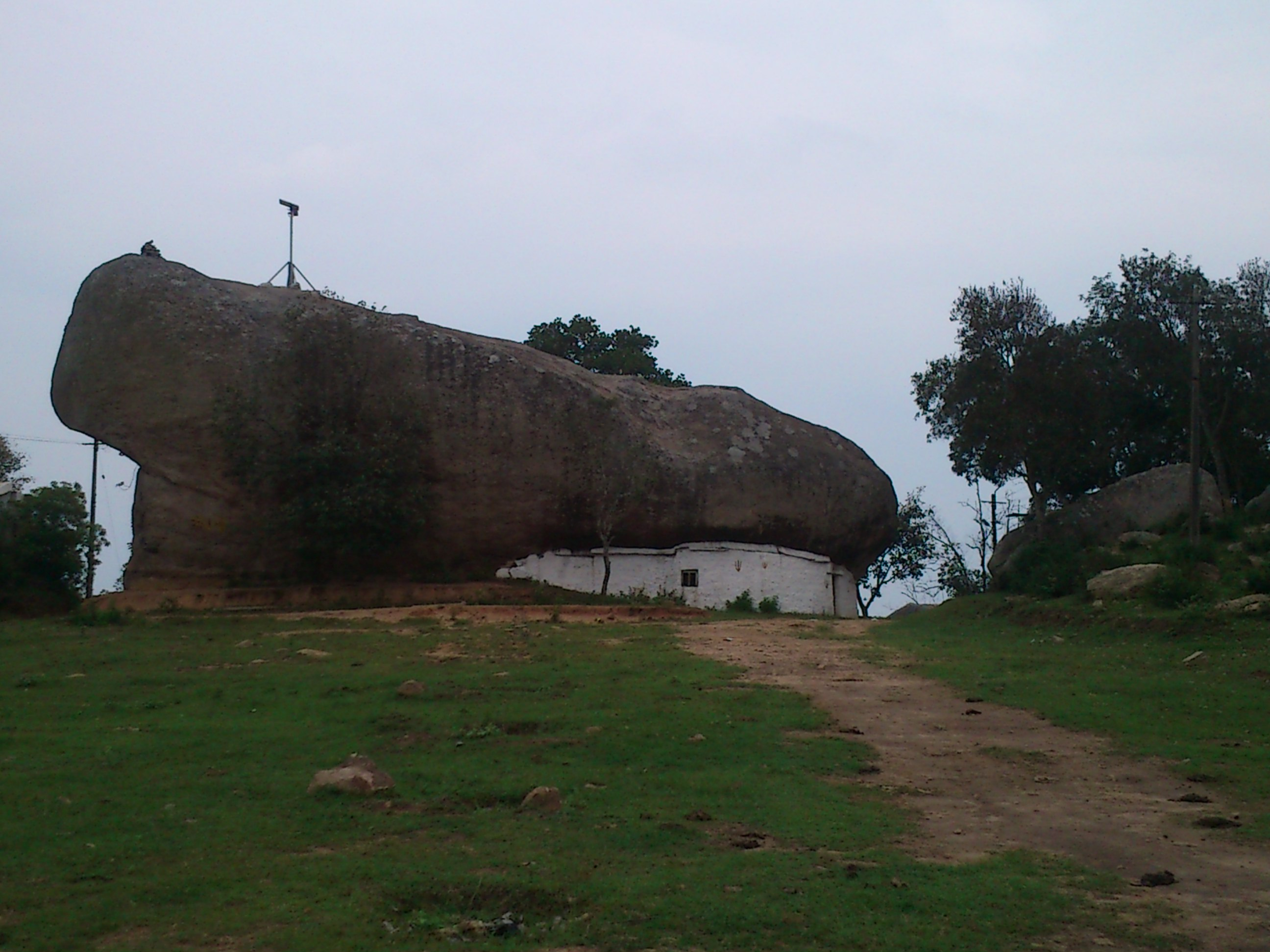
Bilikal Rangaswamy hill near Kanakapura (2012)
