= Channapatna =

- City
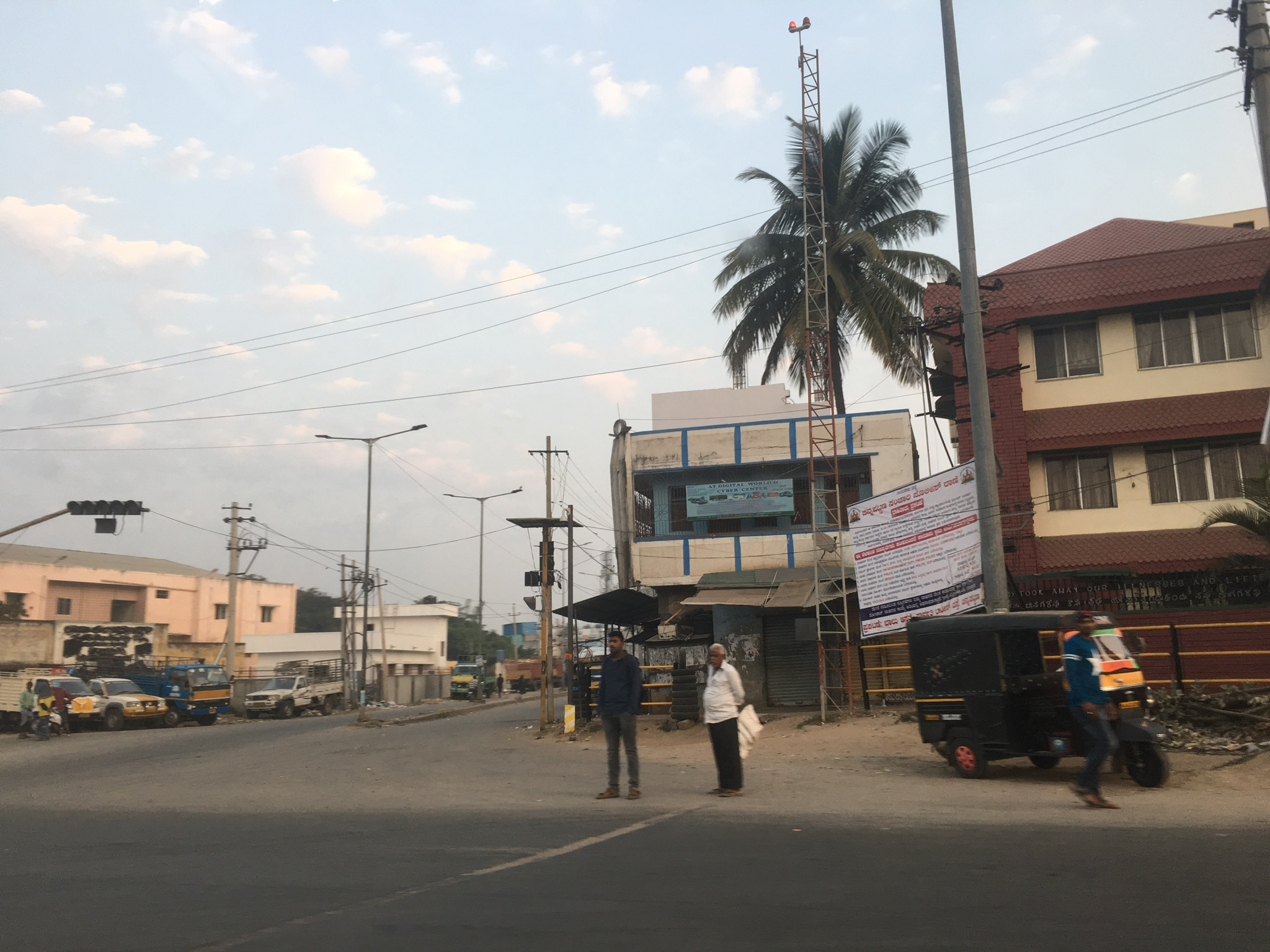
- Nicknames: The Land of Toys, Ground Zero
- Location in Karnataka, India
- Coordinates: 12.6530°N 77.2050°E
- Country: India
- State: Karnataka
- District: Bengaluru South District

Area
  - Total: 12.87 km^{2} (4.97 sq mi)
- Elevation: 673 m (2,208 ft)

Languages
  - Official: Kannada
- Time zone: UTC+5:30 (IST)
- PIN: 562160
- Telephone code: 91-80 / 91-8113
- Vehicle registration: KA 42
- Website: channapatnacity.mrc.gov.in

Channapattana or Chennapattana is a city, taluka located on the banks of Kanva river and taluk headquarters in Bengaluru South district. Channapatna is approximately 60 km from Bangalore and 75 km from Mysore. Channapatna toys are popular all over the world and have geographical indication tag.

== Geography ==
Channapatna has an average elevation of 739 metres (2424 ft).

Total length of roads is 108.20 km. Total water supply is 70.50 litres per capita per day. This means a per capita water supply of 65.50 litres. In summer the temperature is 32 °C. In winter it is 19 °C.

Channapatna is located on the Bangalore - Mysore highway. It is about 60 km from Bangalore,75 km from Mysore and 36 km from Mandya.

== Demographics ==
As of the 2011 India census, Channapatna City Municipal Council has a population of 71,942 (36,098 males and 35,844 females) as reported by Census India 2011.

Religions in Channapatna City (2011)
Religion	Percent
Hinduism	55.66%
Islam	42.96%
Other or not stated	1.38%
Distribution of religions

Languages of Channapatna City (2011 census)
1. Kannada (48.0%)
2. Urdu (43.0%)
3. Tamil (4.22%)
4. Telugu (2.73%)
5. Hindi (0.83%)
6. Others (1.17%)

== Notable people ==
- D Javaregowda-Popular Kannada writer
- B. Saroja Devi - Legendary actress and one of the foremost stars of Indian cinema, celebrated for her contributions to Kannada, Tamil, Telugu and Hindi films.
- BC Ramesh- Former international Kabaddi player and coach
- Kishore- Actor in South India

== Toys ==
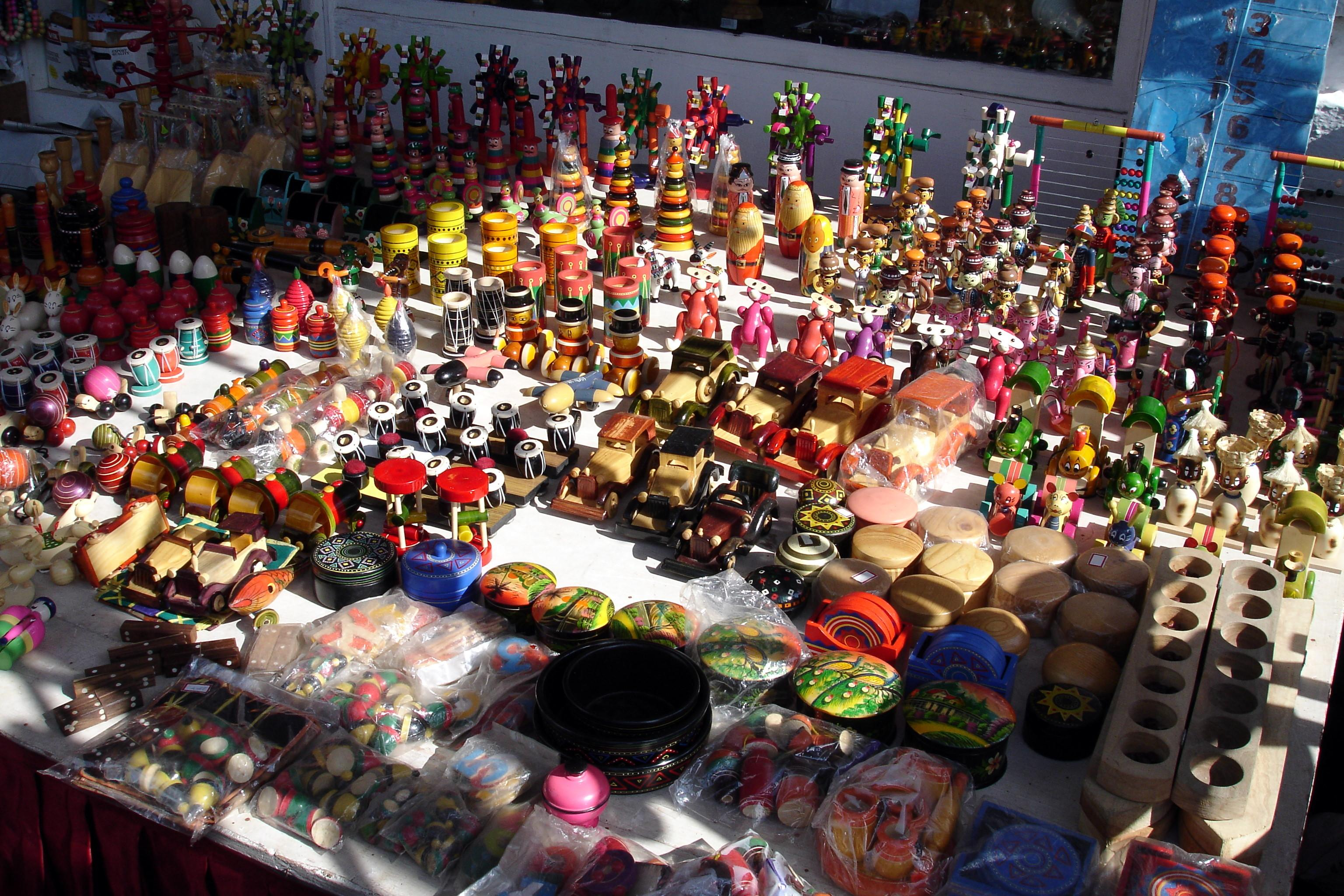
Assorted toys of Channapatna

The city is known for its namesake wooden toys and lacquerware. Channapatna is also called "town of toys" ("Gombegala nagara"). These toys are manufactured in traditional and advanced small-scale industries. Manufacturing and twisting of raw silk, rice, ragi and coconut is a major product of Channapattana taluk. The origin of this industry is said to have been laid down during Tipu Sultan's reign. These toys have been given Geographical Indication tag by Government of India.
