= Bengaluru South district =

Bengaluru South District Ramanagara district
- District of Karnataka
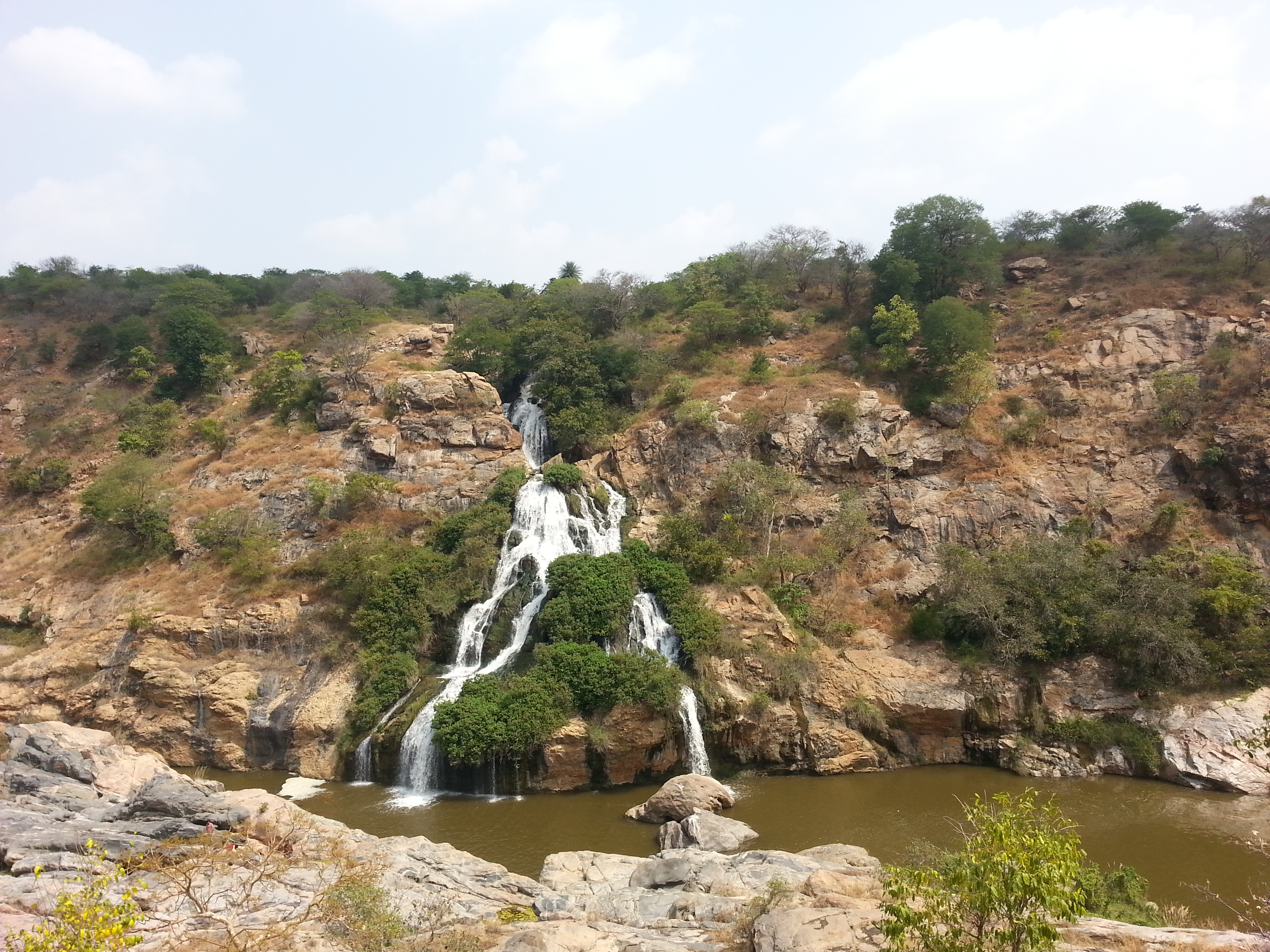
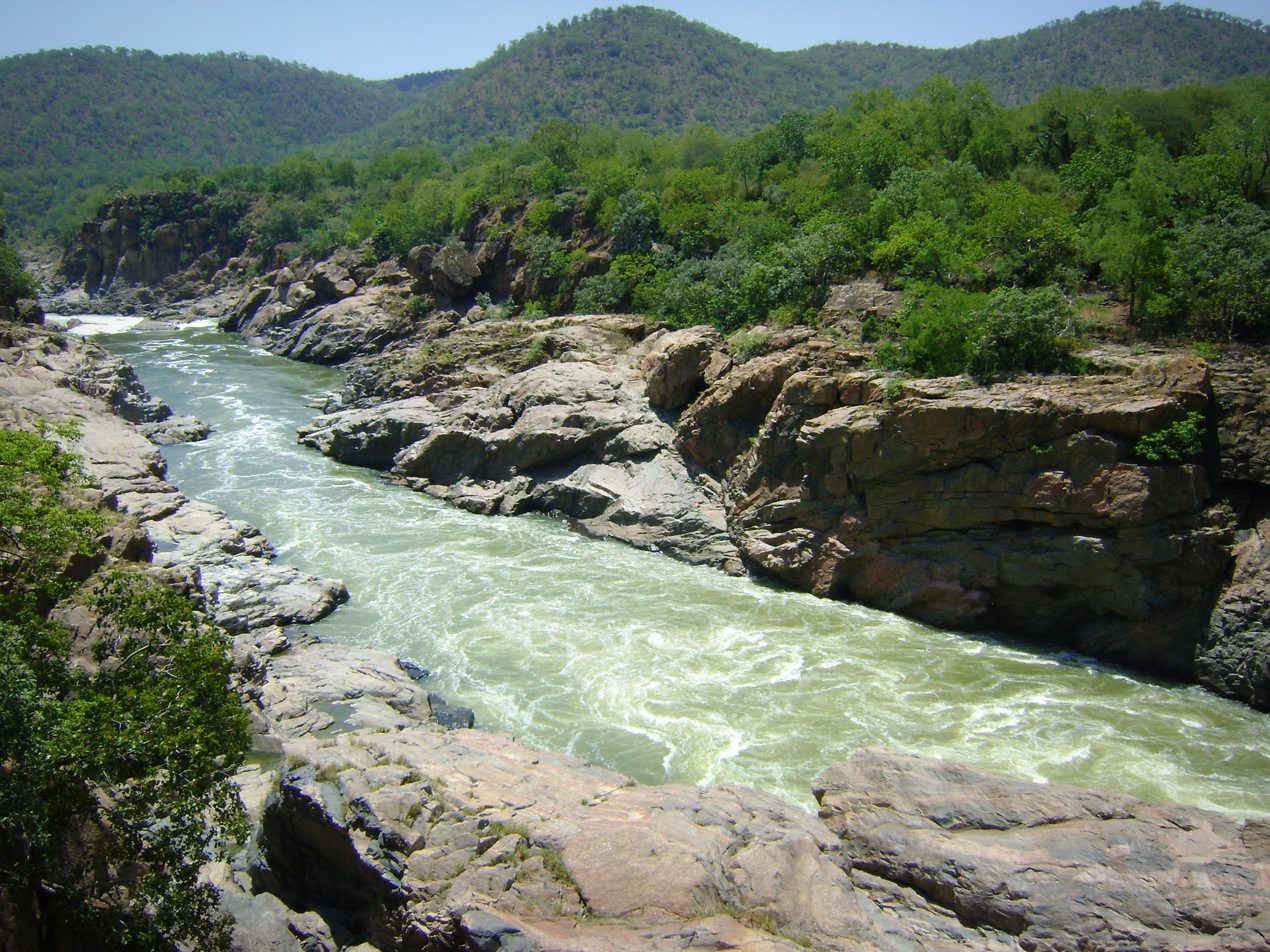
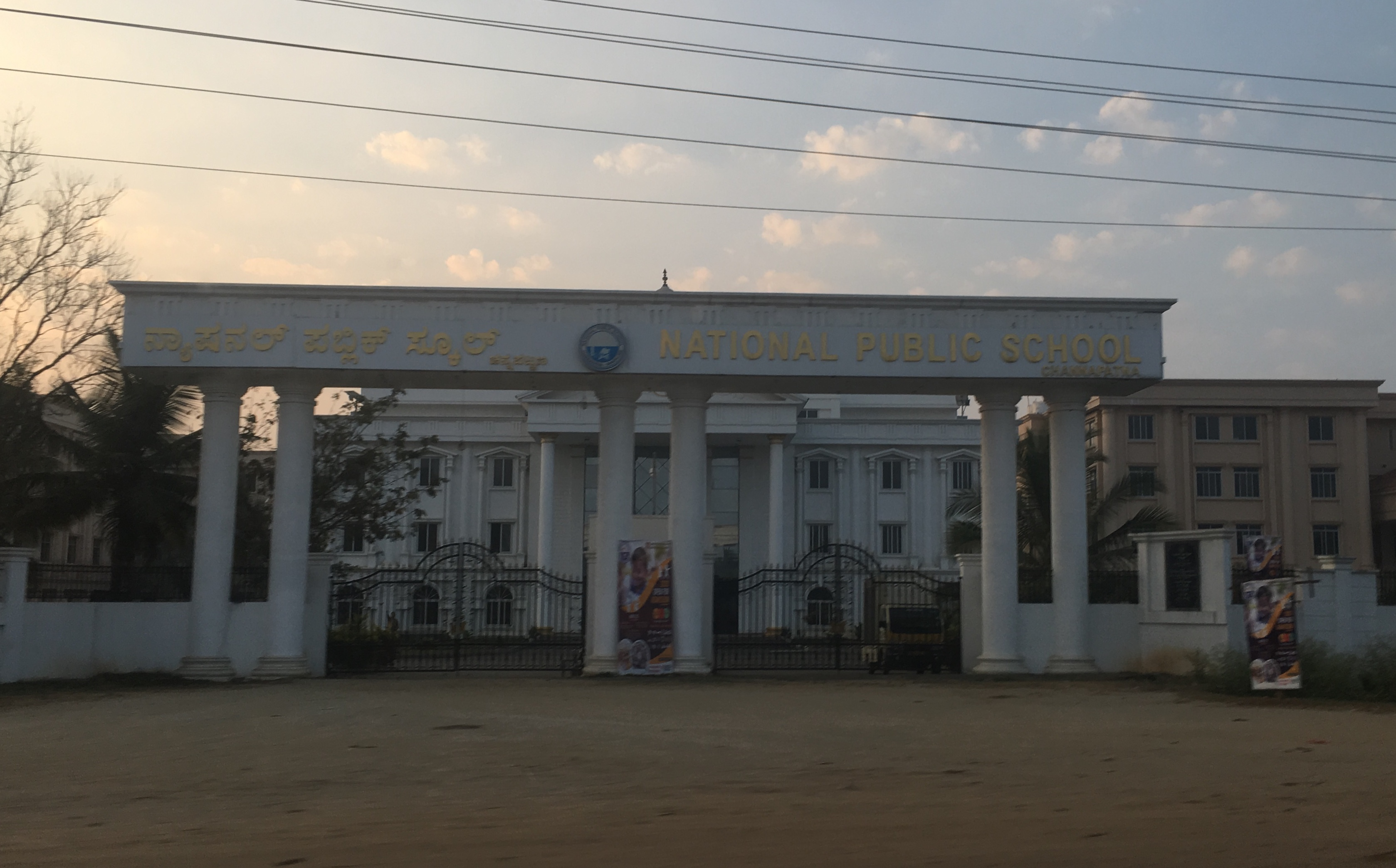
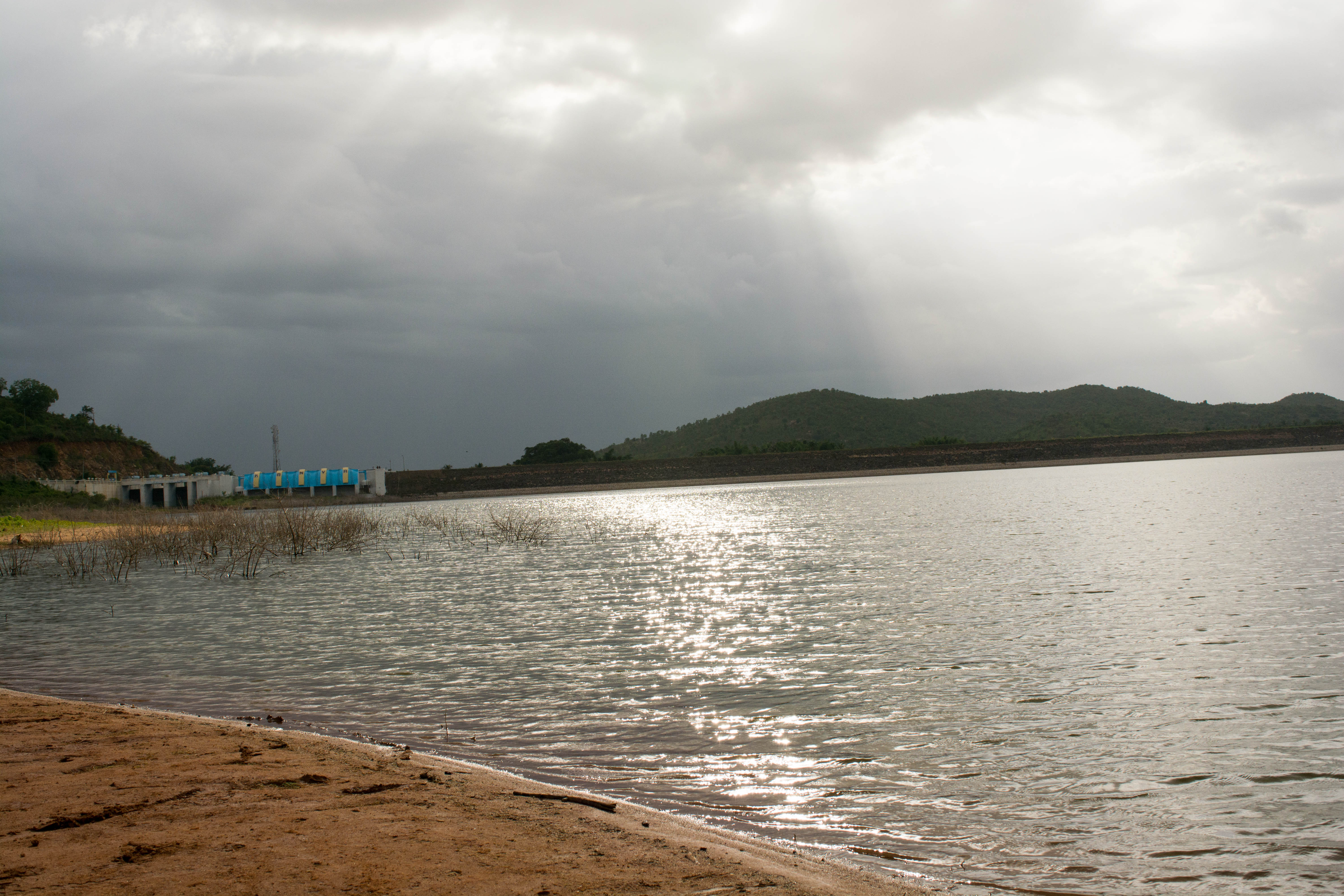
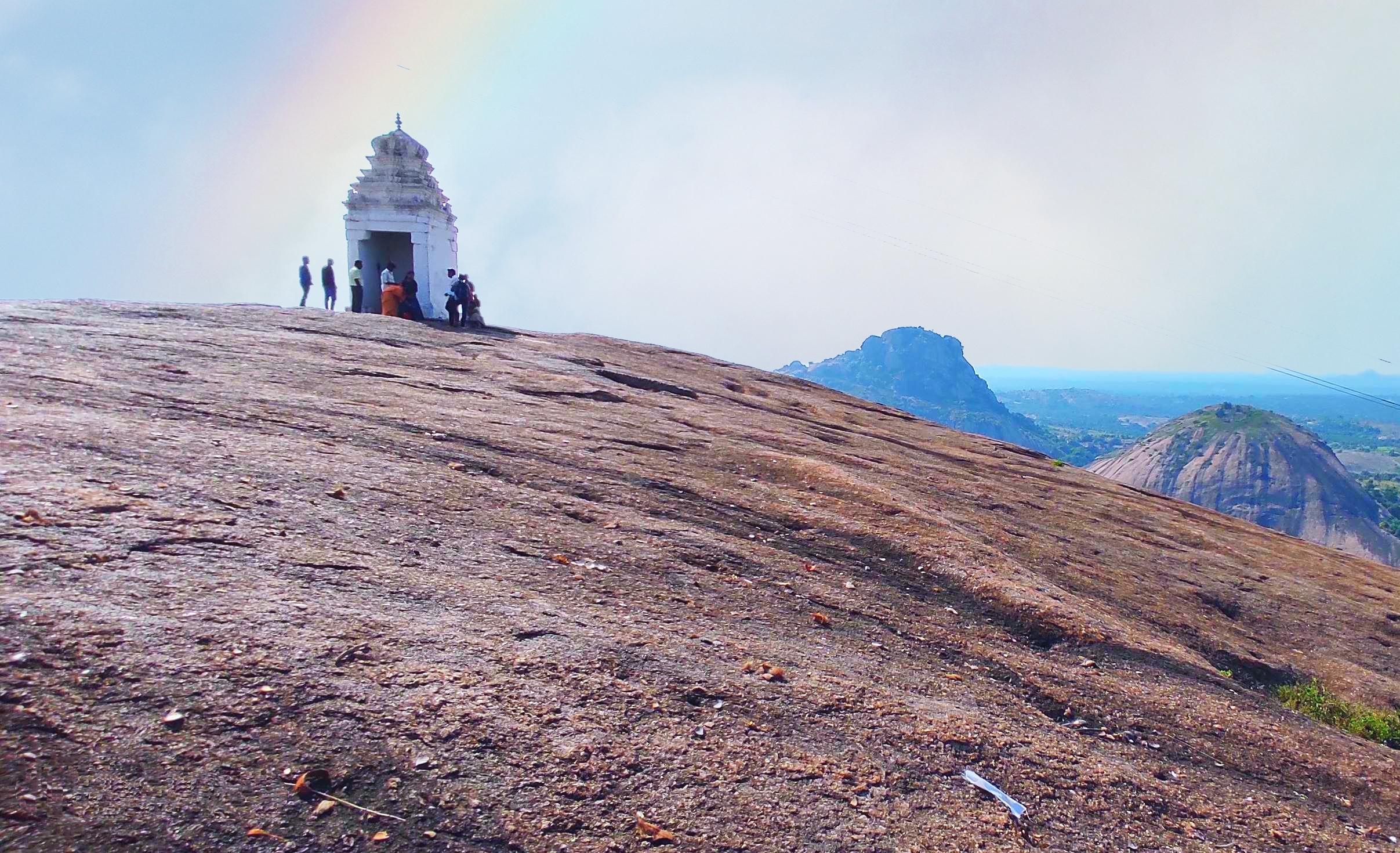
- Clockwise from top-left: Chunchi Falls, Kaveri at Mekedatu, Kanva Reservoir, Revanasiddeshwara Betta, National Public School in Channapatna
- Interactive map of Bengaluru South District
- Coordinates: 12.71°N 75.28°E
- Country: India
- State: Karnataka
- Headquarters: Ramanagara
- Talukas: Ramanagara, Channapattana, Kanakapura, Magadi, Harohalli

Government
  - Deputy Commissioner & District Magistrate: Yeshwanth V. Gurukar, IAS
  - Superintendent of Police (SP): Srinivas Gowda, IPS
  - District incharge Minister: H. C. Balakrishna

Area
  - Total: 3,516 km^{2} (1,358 sq mi)

Population (2011)
  - Total: 1,082,636
  - Density: 307.9/km^{2} (797.5/sq mi)

Languages
  - Official: Kannada
- Time zone: UTC+5:30 (IST)
- PIN: 562117, 562159, 562160, 562112
- Vehicle registration: KA 42
- Website: bengalurusouth.nic.in

Bengaluru South district is one of the 31 districts of Karnataka state in southern India. Ramanagara City is the administrative headquarters of this district. The district is part of Bengaluru Mysore Infrastructure Corridor. The district was created as Ramanagara district in 2007 by splitting away from Bangalore Rural district, and renamed Bengaluru South district on 23 May 2025.

== History ==
Ramanagara district was carved out of the erstwhile Bangalore Rural district on 23 August 2007, comprising Ramanagara, Channapatna, Harohalli, Kanakapura and Magadi taluks. To date, it has given highest number of Chief Ministers for Karnataka of any of the state's districts, namely Kengal Hanumanthaiah, Ramakrishna Hegde and D. K. Shivakumar.

In 2020 there was a proposal to rename the district to "New Bengaluru district". In July 2024, the Government of Karnataka voted to rename the district to Bengaluru South district, and said that the Revenue Department would begin the process of renaming the district. As of January 2025, the federal Home Ministry have yet to approve on district renaming. Bengaluru South district was renamed from the erstwhile Ramanagara district on 23 May 2025.

== Geography ==
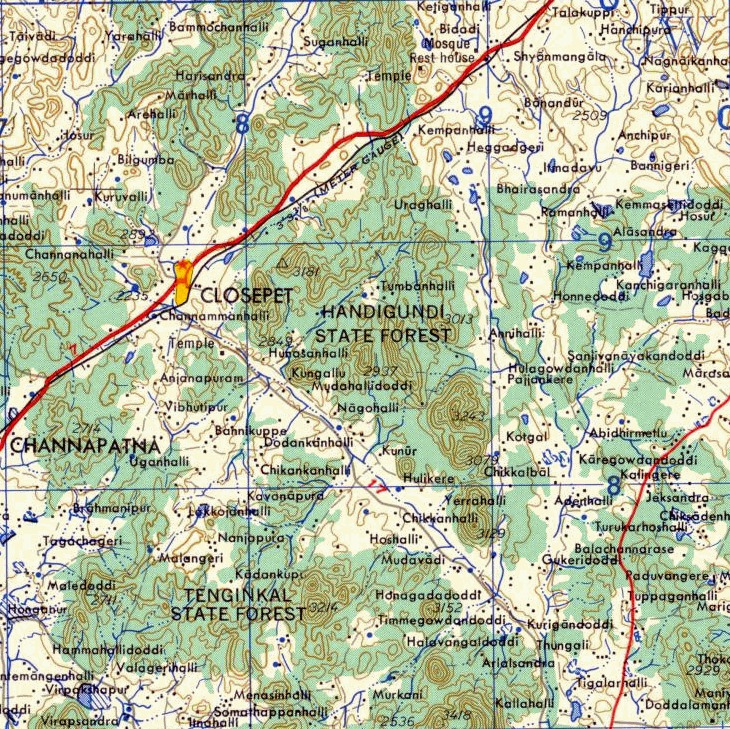
Map of the region

Ramanagara is approximately 50 km southwest of Bangalore. The district shares borders with the districts of Bangalore Urban in the east, Bangalore Rural in the North-east, Tumakuru in the North-west, Mandya in the west and Chamarajanagara in the south-west and Krishnagiri district of Tamilnadu state in the south. It has an average elevation of 747 metres (2450 feet).

Channapatna Taluk and parts of Kanakapura Taluk are similar to demographics of Neighbouring Mandya district whereas parts of Magadi taluk are much closer to Tumakuru District. Also Kanakapura and Harohalli Taluks share border with Anchetty and Denkakote Talukas of Tamilnadu so few parts here we can find different slang of kannada being used.

Ramanagara is famous for the huge rocky outcroppings. The popular places for rock climbing are; Savandurga which is 31 km away from Ramanagara, Ramadevarabetta located within the city, Sri Revana Siddeshwara (SRS) betta which is 15.1 km away from Ramanagara, Thenginkaibetta near to SRS betta and Kabbaladurga which is 35 km away from Ramanagara.

This region has several tall granitic hills which are famous for many short rock climbs, typically 1 to 2 pitches in length. Grades vary from 5.8 American to 5.11 American. It is home to some of the world's oldest granite outcrops. Some of the interesting climbs are on the Wanakkal wall ("Gabbar ki asli pasand", "Labor pain"), on the Rainbow wall ("UIAA", "Kalia"), on Anna-Thamma ("Darkness at dawn", "Black Diamond", the name Anna-Thama means 'elder-brother-younger-brother' in Kannada).

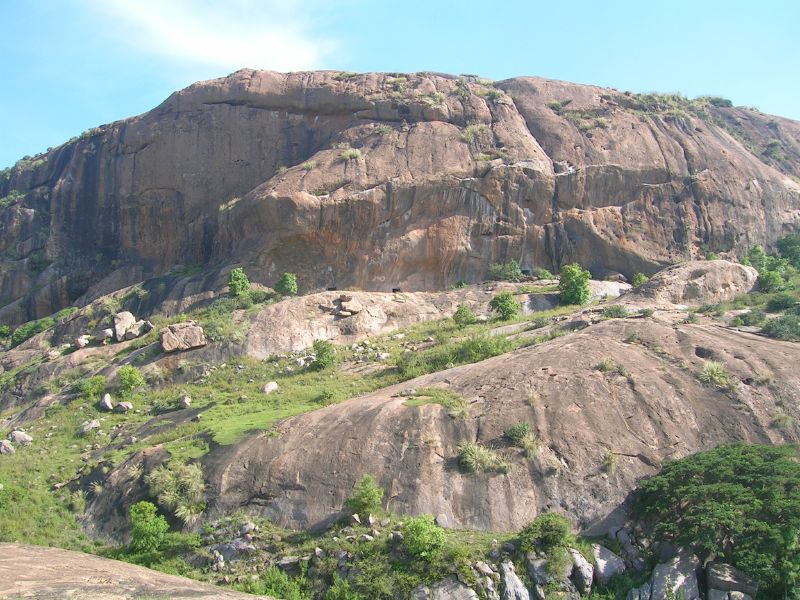
Ramdevarabetta showing the cave entrances made for the film A Passage to India (film)

Another well-known hill is Ramadevarabetta. Along with Savandurga this was one of the shooting locations for David Lean's A Passage to India. Small door like grottoes was made in the rock to resemble caves. It was also in this region that the path-breaking Hindi movie, Sholay, was shot.

Other famous hills in the region include the Revanasideshwara hill and Handigundi. Bilikal Rangaswamy Betta is a popular tourist spot in the district.

These hills have been threatened by quarrying and also plans to carve these hills into statues. The region is covered in scrub forest and is home to threatened bird species such as the yellow-throated bulbul and long-billed vultures. The hill is today one of the few locations in south India where long-billed vultures nest. The region is also home to numerous sloth bears.

=== Closepet granites ===
Distribution of the Closepet granites

The Closepet granites are a major geological feature of this region and are from the Lower Proterozoic era. This belt of rocks extends in the north-south direction in 50 km belt. This belt has younger potassic granites and is believed to separate two distinct crustal blocks of Archaean age. The block to the west has low-grade granite-greenstone belts with iron-manganese ores and to the east are younger gneiss of granitic and granodioritic composition with gold-bearing schist belts.

== Demographics ==
Historical population

Year	Pop.	±% p.a.
1901	262,843	—
1911	288,219	+0.93%
1921	311,945	+0.79%
1931	367,516	+1.65%
1941	415,233	+1.23%
1951	515,413	+2.18%

Year	Pop.	±% p.a.
1961	598,301	+1.50%
1971	683,221	+1.34%
1981	843,509	+2.13%
1991	955,669	+1.26%
2001	1,030,546	+0.76%
2011	1,082,636	+0.49%

Religions in Ramanagara district (2011)
Religion	Percent
Hinduism	88.60%
Islam	10.56%
Christianity	0.59%
Other or not stated	0.25%

According to the 2011 census Ramanagara district has a population of 1,082,636, roughly equal to the nation of Cyprus or the US state of Rhode Island. This gives it a ranking of 421st in India (out of a total of 640). The district has a population density of 303 inhabitants per square kilometre (780/sq mi). Its population growth rate over the decade 2001-2011 was 5.06%. Ramanagaram has a sex ratio of 976 females for every 1000 males, and a literacy rate of 69.2%. 24.73% of the population lives in urban areas. Scheduled Castes and Scheduled Tribes make up 18.83% and 2.12% of the population respectively.

Languages of Ramanagara district (2011)
1. Kannada (83.5%)
2. Urdu (10.5%)
3. Telugu (2.21%)
4. Lambadi (1.32%)
5. Tamil (1.08%)
6. Others (1.39%)

At the time of the 2011 census, 83.49% of the population spoke Kannada, 10.51% Urdu, 2.21% Telugu, 1.32% Lambadi and 1.08% Tamil as their first language.

== Villages ==
- Abbanakuppe
- Abburu
- Achalu (Kanakapura)
- Kodamballi
- Hucchayyanadoddi (Kodamballi)
- Kabbala
- Saraguru
- Iggaluru
- Agrahara Valagerehalli
- Hunasanahalli, Channapatna
- Akkur, Channapatna
- Akkur, Ramanagara
- Nagavara
- Bevooru
- Kengal
- Bidadi
- Doddalahalli
- J. Byadarahalli
- Byrapatna
- Chakkere
- Kodihalli
- Neraluru
- Gowdagere
- Kudur
- Maluru
- Manchanabele
- Megalapalya
- Mayasandra
- Sankalagere, Channapatna
- Sathanur, Kanakapura
- Sathanur, Magadi
- Singarajipura
- Thadikavagilu
- Kolliganahalli
