= Ramanagara =

Ramanagara Ramanagara
- City
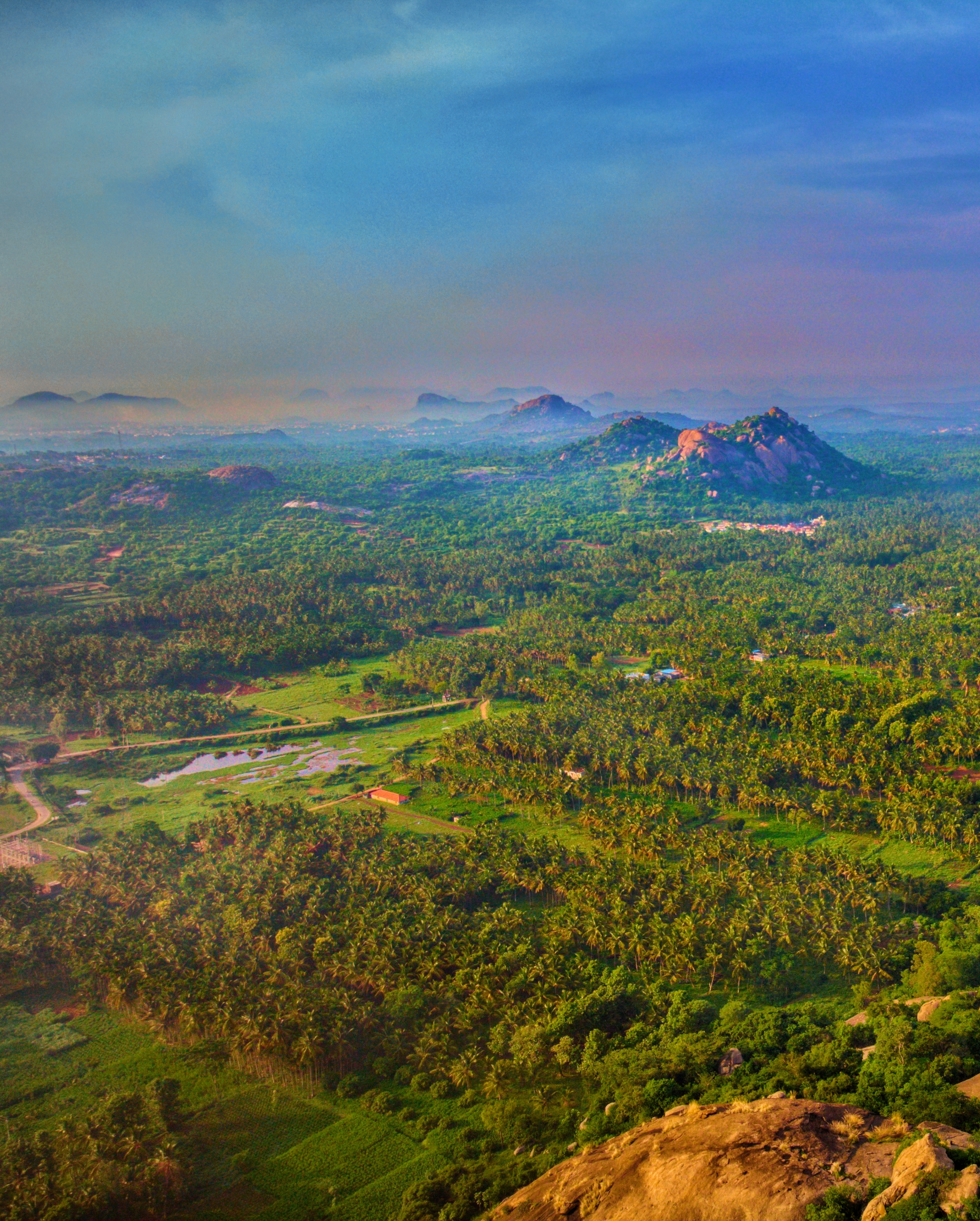
- Aerial view of fields near Ramanagara
- Nicknames: Silk City of Karnataka, Rock City and Ramanagara name came after Greater Ruler of this region Maitri Gowda ruled for longer duration from 17th century to 19th century.
- Location in Karnataka, India
- Coordinates: 12.723°N 77.286°E
- Country: India
- State: Karnataka
- District: Bengaluru South
- District Headquarter: Ramanagara

Government
  - Type: City Municipal Council
  - Body: Ramanagara City Municipal Council
  - President of CMC: K. Sheshadri (INC)
  - Vice President: -
- Elevation: 747 m (2,451 ft)

Population (2011)
  - Total: 95,167

Languages
  - Official: Kannada
- Time zone: UTC+5:30 (IST)
- Postal code: 562159
- Vehicle registration: KA-42
- Website: www.ramanagaracity.mrc.gov.in/en/home

Ramanagara is a city, taluka in the Indian state of Karnataka. It is approximately 50 kilometres from Bengaluru.

The Bollywood movie Sholay was shot in 1975 at the surrounding hills of Ramanagara now called Ramagiri hills but also has nickname of Sholay hills. Also the 2022 Malayalam film Jana Gana Mana was also shot here.

The town was known as Shamsherabad or Ramserpuram at the ruling time of the Mysorean emperor, Tipu Sultan. It was called Closepet, after Sir Barry Close (1756–1813) in pre-independence times. This name is retained in geology. Then Rahim Nagar or Shamserabad was called Ramanagara. Ramanagara's name was based on the historical story of the Ramayana.

== Demographics ==
As of 2011 India census, Ramanagara had a population of 95,167. Males constitute 52% of the population and females 48%. Ramanagara has an average literacy rate of 63%, higher than the national average of 59.5%: male literacy is 67%, and female literacy is 58%. In Ramanagara, 13% of the population is under 6 years of age.

Figures for the district, which was carved out of Bangalore Rural in September 2007, are not available as yet. Now it is changed to Ramanagara district.

Religions in Ramanagara City (2011)
Religion	Percent
Hinduism	51.04%
Islam	47.65%
Other or not stated	1.31%
Distribution of religions

Languages of Ramanagara City (2011 census)
1. Urdu (47.6%)
2. Kannada (42.4%)
3. Telugu (4.43%)
4. Tamil (2.61%)
5. Marathi (1.42%)
6. Others (1.56%)

== Economy ==
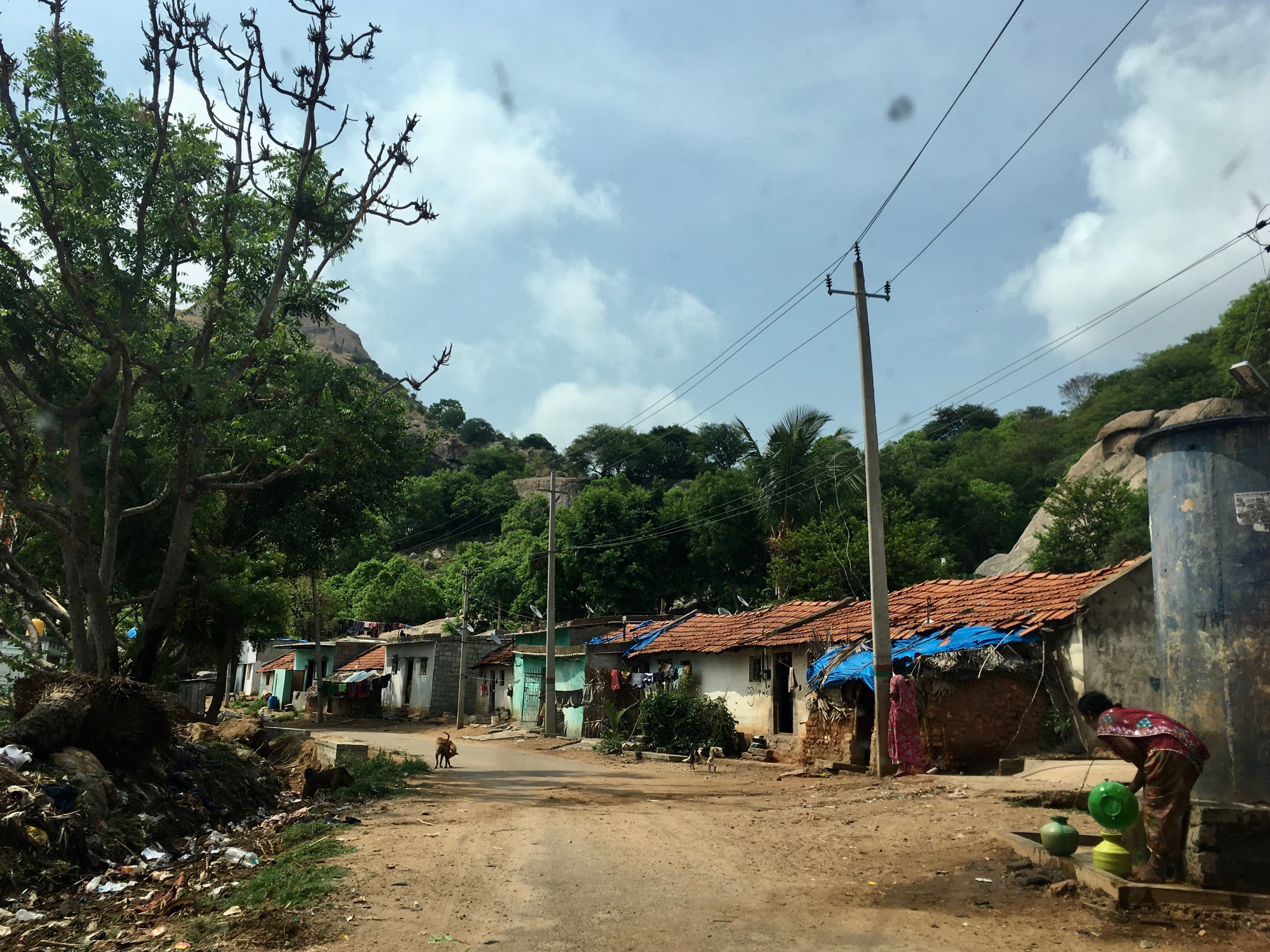
Street view of Ramanagara

Ramanagara is well known for its sericulture, and is nicknamed Silk Town and Silk City. The silk produced in this region forms the input for the famous Mysore Silk. Ramanagara is the largest market for silk cocoons in Asia. 50 tonnes of cocoon a day arrive at the town. Ramanagara has extensive granite sites.

== Closepet granites ==
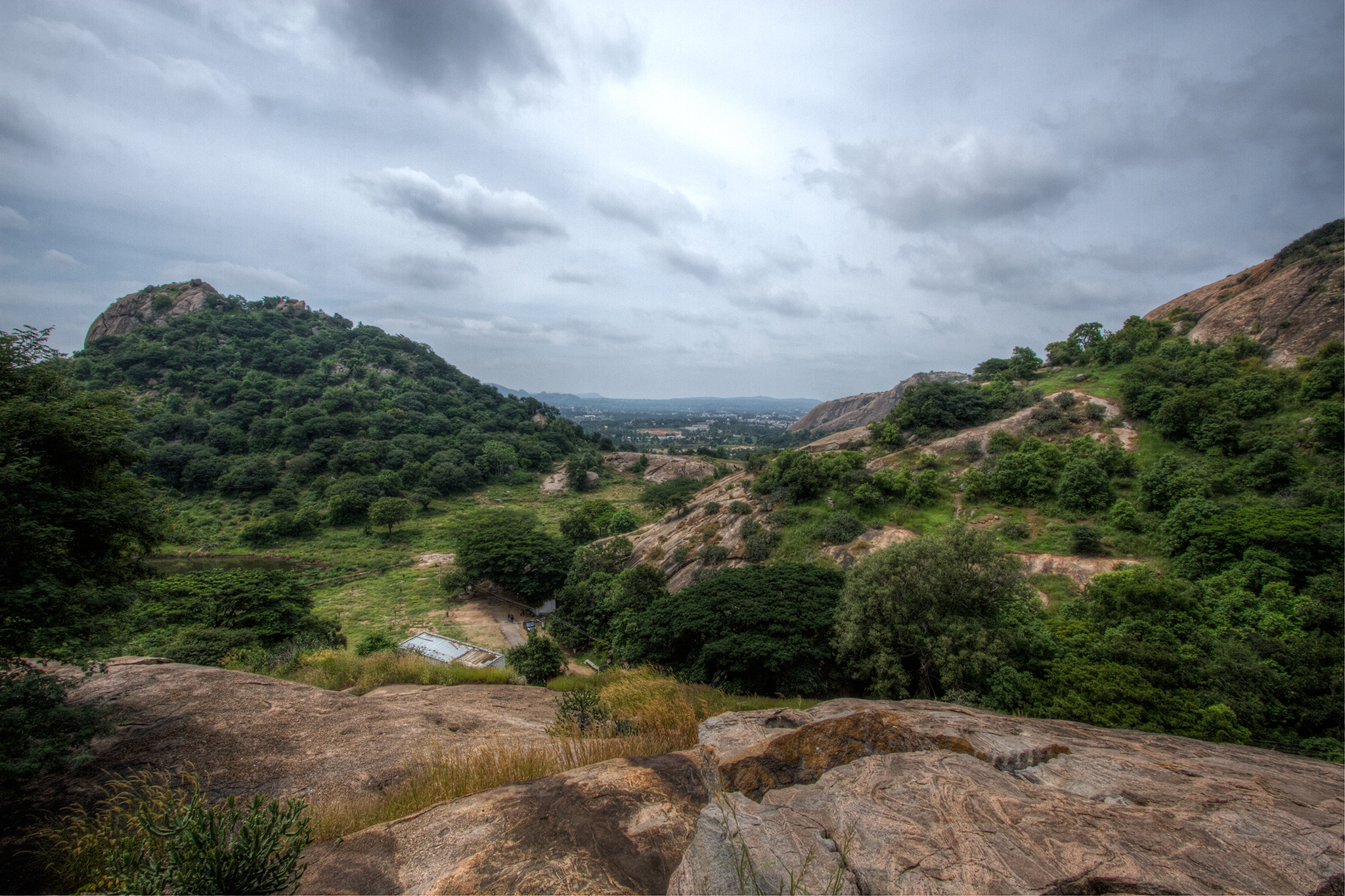
Ramanagara Hills

Distribution of the Closepet granites

The Closepet granites are a major geological feature of this region and are from the Lower Proterozoic era. This belt of rocks extends in the north-south direction in 50 km belt. This belt has younger potassic granites and is believed to separate two distinct crustal blocks of Archaean age. The block to the west has low-grade granite-greenstone belts with iron-manganese ores and to the east are younger gneisses of granitic and granodioritic composition with gold-bearing schist belts.

== See also ==
- Climbing locations in India
