= Balepete inscriptions and hero stones =

Balepete is a sub-locality in the Pete area of old Bengaluru. The Pete area is one of the oldest continuously inhabited areas of commerce in Bengaluru and is presently Bengaluru's largest informal economic cluster. It was roughly constructed in the 16th century, allegedly by Kempegowda I, the then-chieftain of the Bengaluru area and a vassal of the Karnataka Empire (Vijayanagara Empire). The Ranganathaswamy Temple is Balepete, said to be constructed by the Kempegowda Chieftains, this temple houses a Telugu language donatory inscription in the Kannada script.

== History ==
The Telugu-language donatory inscription in the Kannada script is dated Thursday, 17 February 1628, which is mentioned in the inscription as "śakavarṣaṃbulu 1549agu yaḍi prabhava saṃvvatsara maga su 13". It was issued during the reign of Vira Pratapa Ramadeva Maharaya of the Karnataka Empire when Kemppanachaya Gowna's grandson, Kempe Gowna's son, Immadi KempeGowna was ruling Yelahanka Naadu. Yelahanka naadu was an administrative unit (naadu) ruled by the Kempegowda chieftains. Yelahanka Naadu was part of Kelekunda-300, which was in turn part of the bigger administrative unit Gangavaadi-96000.

The inscription records the donation to Bengaluru's Mutyalapete Ranganathaswamy temple for various pooja activities by Ayyavali, Ubhaya (nanadeshi), Salamula, and other trader communities. This inscription, further, records that trader communities from Penugonda, Benguluru, Guluru, Chikkanayanipalli (Chikkanayakanahalli), Ballapuram (Chikkaballapura), Taataparti (Tadipatri), Chandragiri, Kolala (Kolar), Kotakota (Hoskote), Kaveripatna, Rayakota, Srirangapatna, Narasipura (T Narsipura), Beluru, Heburu (Hebbur), Nagamangala, Yikkeri (Ikkeri), Basti (possibly Palli) requested and received permission from Immadi Kempegowda to make a donation for Neivedya, seasonal pujas, etc.

Gowna, as mentioned in the inscription, is the same as Gowda and referred to the position of a village head in ancient times. The inscription is significant as it mentions the name Bengaluru verbatim in Kannada and its mention of the genealogy of Immadi Kempegowda. The inscription was first documented in Epigraphia Carnatica Volume 9.

=== Physical characteristics ===
The inscription is 122 cm tall and 39 cm wide. The Kannada characters are approximately 3 cm tall, 4 cm wide and 0.12 cm deep.

=== Transliteration of the inscription ===
The text published below is the rereading published in the Journal of the Mythic Society.

Line Number	Kannada	IAST
1	ಸ್ವಸ್ತಿಶ್ರೀ ವಿಜಯಾಭ್ಯುದಯ ಶಾಲಿ . .	svastiśrī vijayābhyudaya śāli . .
2	. ಶಕವರ್ಷಂಬುಲು ೧೫೪೯ಅಗು .	. śakavarṣaṃbulu 1549agu .
3	. ಯಡಿ ಪ್ರಭವ ಸಂವ್ವತ್ಸರ ಮಗ ಸು ೧೩ ಆ .	. yaḍi prabhava saṃvvatsara maga su 13 ā .
4	ಶ್ರೀಮದ್ರಾಜಾಧಿರಾಜ ರಾಜಪರ .	śrīmadrājādhirāja rājapara .
5	ಶ್ವರ ಶ್ರೀವೀರ ಪ್ರತಾಪ ಶ್ರೀವೀರ	śvara śrīvīra pratāpa śrīvīra
6	ರಾಮದೇವಮಹಾರಾಯಲಯ್ಯ	rāmadevamahārāyalayya
7	ವಾರು ರತ್ನ ಸಿಂಹಸನಾರೂ .	vāru ratna siṃhasanārū .
8	ಲೈ ಪೃಥ್ವಿ ಸಾಂಮ್ರಜ್ಯಂಚೆಯುಚುಂ	lai pṛthvi sāṃmrajyaṃcĕyucuṃ
9	. ಂಡಗಾನು ಆ ಸಂನವಕುಲೈ .	. ṃḍagānu ā saṃnavakulai
10	ಯಲಹಂಕನಾಡ ಪ್ರಭುಲೈನ	yalahaṃkanāḍa prabhulaina
11	ಕೆಂಪ್ಪನಾಚಯಗೌನಿವಾರಿ ಪಾತ್ರುಲೈ .	kĕṃppanācayagaunivāri pātrulai .
12	ಕೆಂಪೇಗೌನಿವಾರಿ ಪುತ್ರುಲೈನ ಯಿಂಮ	kĕṃpegaunivāri putrulaina yiṃma
13	ಡಿ ಕೆಂಪೆಗೌನಯ್ಯವಾರು ಸಧ್ದರ್ಮ(*) ಪ್ರ	ḍi kĕṃpĕgaunayyavāru sadhdarma(*) pra
14	ತಿಪಾಲಕುಲೈ ಸುಖರಾಜ್ಯಂಚೆಯ	tipālakulai sukharājyaṃcĕya
15	ಚುಂನಗಾನು ಬೆಂಗುಳುರಿ ಪೇಟ .	cuṃnagānu bĕṃgul̤ṳri peṭa
16	ದು ಸಮಸ್ತಲು ಸಮಯಂತೀರ್ಚುಕೊ .	du samastalu samayaṃtīrcukŏ
17	ವಚ್ಚಿನ ಸ್ವಸ್ತಿ ಸಮಸ್ತ ನಿಜಮಹಾಂಕಾ .	vaccina svasti samasta nijamahāṃkā .
18	ಕಾ ಪ್ರಶಸ್ತ ಸಮಸ್ತುಲೈನ ಶ್ರೀ ಮದ್ಗ .	kā praśasta samastulaina śrī madga .
19	ಶ್ವರ ಗೌರೀಶ್ವರ ವೀರನಾರಾಣಾ ದಿವ್ಯಶ್ರೀ	śvara gaurīśvara vīranārāṇā divyaśrī
20	ಪಾದಪದ್ಮಾರಾಧಕುಲೈನ ಅಯ್ಯಾವಳಿ	pādapadmārādhakulaina ayyāval̤i
21	. ಖ್ಯುಲೈನ ಸ್ವದೇಶ ಪರದೇಶ ವುಭಯನಾ	. khyulaina svadeśa paradeśa vubhayanā
22	. . ಶಂ ಸಾಲುಮೂಲ ಸಮಸ್ಥ ಪೆಕ್ಕಂಡ್ರು	. . śaṃ sālumūla samastha pĕkkaṃḍru
23	ಪೆನುಗೊಂಡ ಬೆಂಗುಳೂರು ಗುಳುರು ಚಿಕ್ಕನಾಯನಿ	pĕnugŏṃḍa bĕṃgul̤ūru gu ̤ l̤ṳru cikkanāyani
24	ಪಲ್ಲೆಲ್ಲಂ ಬಳ್ಳಾಪುರಂ ತಾಟಪರ್ತಿ(*) ಆವ . . ಚಂ	pallĕllaṃ bal̤l̤̤āpur ̤ aṃ tāṭaparti āva . . caṃ
25	ದ್ರಗಿರಿ ಕೋಳಾಲ ಕೊತ್ತಕೋಟ ಕಾವೇರಿಪಟ್ಣ ರಾಯ	dragiri kol̤āla k ̤ ŏttakoṭa kāveripaṭṇa rāya
26	ಕೋಟಂ ಶ್ರೀರಂಗಪಟ್ಣ ನರಶೀಪುರಂ ಬೇಲೂರು	koṭaṃ śrīraṃgapaṭṇa naraśīpuraṃ belūru
27	ಹೆಬುರು ನಾಗಮಂಗಲಂ ಯಿಕ್ಕೇರಿ ಬಸ್ತಿಪ .	hĕburu nāgamaṃgalaṃ yikkeri bastipa .
28	. ದುಲೈನ ಸ್ತಳ ಪರಸ್ತಳ ವುಭಯ ನಾನಾದೇಶಾ ಸಾಲು	. dulaina stal̤a par ̤ astal̤a vubha ̤ ya nānādeśā sālu
29	. ಲ ಸಮಸ್ತಲುಂನ್ನು ಬೆಂಗುಳೂರಿ ಮುತ್ಯಾಲ	. la samastaluṃnnu bĕṃgul̤ūri muty ̤ āla
30	ಪೇಟ ರಂಗಾನಾಥಸ್ವಮಿ ಪಡಿತರ ನೈವೇದ್ಯ .	peṭa raṃgānāthasvami paḍitara naivedya .
31	ರುತಿರುನಾಳು ಮೊದಲೈನ ಧರ್ಮಲಕು ಕೆಂಪೆ	rutirunāl̤u mŏdalaina dharmalak ̤ u kĕṃpĕ
32	ಗೌನಿವಾರಿಕಿ ಯೆರಕಸೇಸಿ ಯಿಚ್ಚಿನ ಮಗ .	gaunivāriki yĕrakasesi yiccina maga .
33	ಪಡಿಕವ ೧ ಟಿಪ ೧ ಟಿ ಅರವೀಸಂ ಲೆಖ್ಖನುವಿ	paḍikava 1 ṭipa 1 ṭi aravīsaṃ lĕkhkhanuvi
34	ಡಿಚೇಸ್ತಿಂ ಅ ಚಂದ್ರಾರ್ಕಸ್ಥಾಯಿಗಾ ಸ್ವಾಮಿ	ḍicestiṃ a caṃdrārkasthāyigā svāmi
35	. . . . . . . . . . . . . . . . . . . . . . . . ದಲೈನ	. . . . . . . . . . . . . . . . . . . . . . . . dalaina
36	. . . . . . . . . . . . . . . . . . . . ಮರ್ಪಿಂ .	. . . . . . . . . . . . . . . . . . . . marpiṃ .
37	(ಮುಂದೆ 15ಸಾಲುಗಳು ಶಾಸನಕಲ್ಲನ್ನು ಗೋಡೆಗೆ ಹಾಕಿಮುಚ್ಚಿರುವುದರಿಂದ ಕೆಳಭಾಗದ ಅಕ್ಷರಗಳು ಕಾಣುವುದಿಲ್ಲ )	(rest of the 15 lines are not visible as it is covered while fixing the stone to the wall)

=== Translation ===
The text is published in Epigraphia Carnatica Volume 9. It reads as follows:

"Be it well. (On the date specified), when the rajadhiraja raja-parameshvara virapratapa vira-Ramadeva-maharaya, seated on the jewel throne, was ruling the empire of the world:— when, of the Asannava-kula, the Yalahanka-nad prabhu Kempanachaya-Gauni's grandson, Kempe-Gauni's son, Immadi-Kempe-Gaunayya was ruling a peaceful kingdom in righteousness; — all the people of Bengalur pete entered into the following agreement; —

Be it well. Obtainers of all favors from their own Mahankalika, worshippers of the lotus feet of (the gods) Ganesvara Gaurishvara and Vira-Narayana, chief men in Ayyavaje, all the Salumula of both Nana Desis of this country and other countries, and all the Salumula of both (sects of) the Nana Desis of Penukonda Bengaluru Guluru Chikkanayinipalle Ballapuram Tatiparti Ava. . Chandragiri Kolala Kottakota Kaveripatna Rayakota Narasipuram Beluru Hebburu Nagamangalam Ikkeri Bastipalli and other places,— for the offerings, festivals and other ceremonies of the god Ranganatha of Mutyalapete in Bengaluru,-— made application to Kempe-Gauni, and granted certain dues (specified)

Usual imprecatory verses. Signatures."
