= Sankighatta =

Village in Karnataka, India

Dallina Vardamana Mahaveera Jain temple
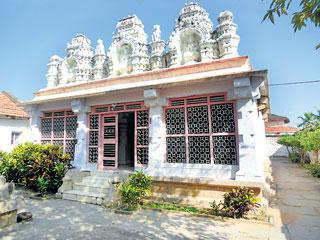
- Sankighatta, Karnataka

Religion
- Affiliation: Jainism
- Deity: Mahavira
- Festivals: Mahavir Jayanti, Mahaveera Moksha Kalyan
- Governing body: Governed by Settru family till 1950 and now by Jain Samaj
- Bhattaraka: Comes under Charukeerthi Bhattaraka of Shravanabelagola

Location
- Location: Magadi Taluk, Ramanagara district, Karnataka

Architecture
- Creator: Narasimha I
- Established: Between 1141 and 1173 CE

Specifications
- Temple: One early Hoysala architecture Jain temple
- Monument: 1
- Inscriptions: Kannada inscription

Sankighatta, is a village in Magadi Taluk, Ramanagara district in Karnataka. The village was a historic Jain site. The name of the village comes from Settra + Ghatta = Settraghatta. In Kannada shettaru were the mercantile community across south India. A Jain temple, Dallina Vardaman Mahaveera Thirtankara Basadi is in the village. The village was historically under the control of Settru family, the Samantha Rajas. They also controlled surrounding places like Kalya (Kalyana pura), Kunigal, Magadi, Savandurga, Hebbur, Mayasandra, Settikere, Veerasagara, Srigiripura, Shivaganga hills, Biskuru, etc.

== History ==
The temple was built by Hoysala Emperor Narasimha I ಒಂದನೆ ನರಸಿಂಹ (1141 - 1173 AD) in respect of Hoysala royal family members who were followers of Jainism and moved away from Belur Halebidu to settle in Sankighatta. Hoysala Emperor Narasimha I appointed one of the Hoysala family members as Dharmadhikari to take care of the Jain temples in and around Sankighatta. They later came to be known as Settru family. We also come across historic evidences about Queen Natyarani Shantaladevi followed Jainism till the end of her life, lived around Sankighatta, like near by place Shivaganga hills and she finally moved to Shravanabelagola and took Sallekhana. Some historians also say Jain Queen Shantaladevi took Sallekhana in Shivaganga hills.

Kalya near Sankighatta was another historic Jain center, one of them was a wooden Jain temple, which was destroyed in fire, set out by non-believers. Stone inscriptions of Hoysala period and destroyed structures of Jain temple, many Jain temple converted to other religious place in Kalya (Kalyana pura). Jain families are present, even today, in and around Sankighatta.

Sankighatta was once famous for cultivation of Paddy, Sugarcane, Coconuts, Arecanut, Mango.

== Prominent people of Sankighatta ==
Settru were an historic Jain family family, who lived in Sankighatta, Settru. The members of Settru family patronised Jainism.

According to historic records, prominent members of the Settru family were -

- Dharmadhikari Bhusavi Settru is an historic Jain person from Settru family of Sankighatta, whose defensive action to save seventy five Jain temples in Kalya (Kalyana pura) near Sankighatta in Hoysala Empire is an historic incident. He was the first Jain to revolt against Srivaiṣṇavas who destroyed many Jain temples around Sankighatta and also took the issue to Hoysala King. The King intervened and made a compromise between Jain and Srivaiṣṇavas. This historic incident in Hoysala Kingdom is well narrated on the only stone inscription of the famous Jain temple, Bhandara Basadi in Sravanabelagola.
- Dharmadhikari Chikka Padmanna Settru, 15th century Kannada Jain poet and the author of Kannada Jain literature work like Ananthanata charita and Vajrakumara charita.
- 17th century Jain scholar by name Dharmadhikari Payappa Settru, was a great devotee of Mahavira.

Historians refers Settru were the existing original clan of Hoysala who followed Jainism even after Hoysala Emperor Vishnuvardhana (Bittideva) converted to Srivaiṣṇavas. Hoysala royal family members along with Bittideva/ Vishnuvardhana's famous and Queen Natyarani (Queen of Dance) pattamahishi Shantaladevi protested the religious conversion and continued to follow Jainism and moved away from Belur Halebidu due to the political and religious situation and settled in Sankighatta.

Other prominent members are Dharmadhikari Settru Vardamanaiah, Dharmadhikari Settru Jawallanaiah, Dharmadhikari Settru Adirajaiah and Dharmadhikari Settru Padmarajaiah was the last person to deliver the responsibility of governing the Jain temple and he handed over the temple keys, roles and responsibility with a written document to Magadi taluk administrator (Tahsildar) around 1950. Settru family members still live in Sankighatta and are respected as Settru maneyavaru (Settru Family in Kannada language). Settru Family members are the patrons / Dharmadhikari of Jain temple and delivered the responsibility of governing the temple from the time it was built till 1950.

== Overview ==
The main attraction of Sankighatta is 11th-century early Hoysala architecture Jain temple, has a sparkling gold colored metal idol of Bhagawan Mahaveera as the main deity.

The damaged and antique black granite statue of Bhagavan Mahaveer is placed just behind the existing main deity in the Jain temple. On the black granite statue of Mahaveer, we can find the stone inscription about the genealogy of Hoysala royal family from Emperor Vinayaditya (1047–1098) to Narasimha I ಒಂದನೆ ನರಸಿಂಹ (1152–1173). Devotees from different parts of India visit this place and offer special prayers. Sankighatta Jain Temple is also the only historic and oldest Jain temple which is near to Karnataka state capital Bangalore.

== Present condition ==
Jain pilgrimage in the princely state of Mysore is narrated in Kannada book "Rajavali Kathasara" published by Mysore University. In this book we can come across many lost Jain temple with name and places which Payappa Settru visited. Many of the Settru family members live in Bangalore. Even today, Settru family members are the first people to lead the religious functions in Dallina Vardaman Mahaveera Thirtankara Temple.

Sankighatta is on the way to Shravanabelagola from Bangalore, (Bangalore Mangalore (BM) road, National Highway NH48, before Kunigal: take right from the main road near Tippasandra hand post/cross and drive for about 7 km to reach Sankighatta). Public and private transport are available from Bangalore, Tumkur, Kunigal, Nelamangala. Now the Jain temple is under Karnataka muzari and Sankighatta Jain community is maintaining the temple.

== See also ==
- Digambara
- Jain sculpture
- Kalya, Magadi inscriptions
