= Shantala Devi =

- Savati Gandhavarini; Natyarani Shantale
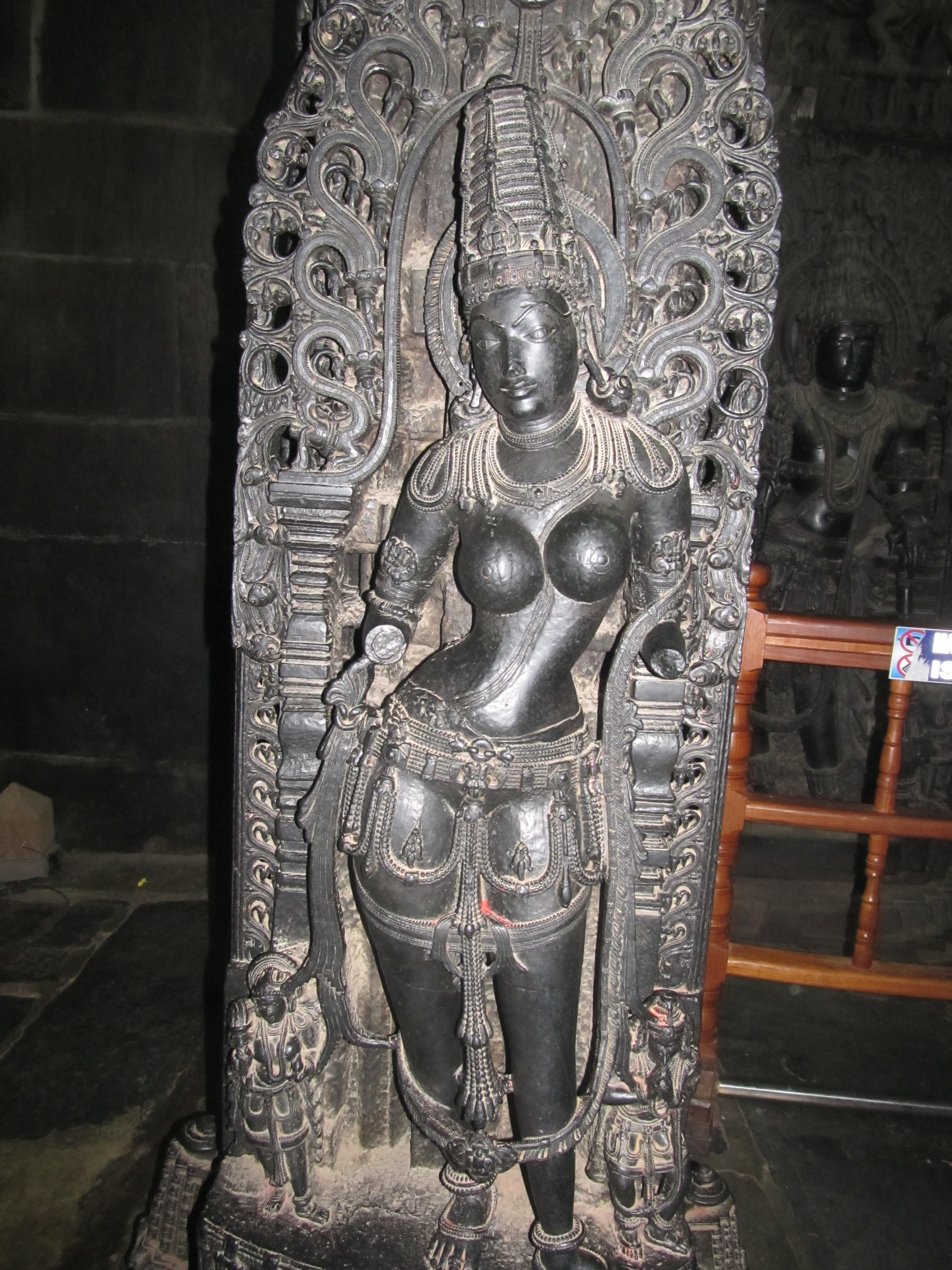
- Born: Balligavi, Karnataka
- Died: Shivagangge, Tumkur District
- Spouse: Bittideva (Vishnuvardhana)
Temple name
- Savati Gandhavara Basadi, Chandragiri Hill, Shravanbelgola
- Dynasty: Hoysala Kingdom
- Father: Marasingamayya
- Mother: Machikabbe
- Religion: Jainism

Shantala Devi (12th century), also known as Natya Rani Shantala, was the queen of the Hoysala king Bittideva, who later took the name Vishnuvardhana (r. c. 1108–1152 CE), in Karnataka, India. She is known for her mastery of classical dance and music, and her patronage of Jainism and culture. Shantala Devi is also remembered for undertaking Sallekhana, the Jain ritual of fasting unto death.

== Early life ==
Little is known about Shantala's early life and family background. She was the daughter of "Machikabbe" and the Hoysala general "Marasingamayya" and hailed from Balligavi, a town in Shikaripur taluk of Shivamogga district. Historical accounts suggest she was highly educated and trained in classical dance and music. She married King Bittideva of the Hoysala dynasty, who later took the name Vishnuvardhana after his formal conversion to Vaishnavism under the influence of Ramanujacharya. The Hoysala capital was at Dvarasamudra (modern Halebidu).

== Titles ==
Shantala Devi was enthroned as "Pattamahadevi" (chief queen) in 1117 CE. She is praised in inscriptions and tradition with titles such as the Gem of Perfect Faith, the Fortress of Jain Faith, the Goddess of Victory in War, and the Goddess of Fame in Wealth and Peace. These titles reflect her devout support for Jainism in the Hoysala period.

A well‑known title of Shantala is "Savati Gandhawarini", which literally means "a rutting elephant to co‑wives" -a striking epithet symbolising her pre‑eminence among the royal consorts.

== Patronage of arts and architecture ==
Shantala Devi is especially remembered for her support of temple construction, sculpture, dance, and music. She is associated with the flourishing of the Hoysala architectural tradition in the 12th century, celebrated for its intricate carvings and elaborate friezes.

Although the Hoysala dynasty is famous for building Jain and Hindu temples, inscriptions and local traditions also record significant grants to Jain temples and basadis made during her time.

== Religion ==
Shantala devi is renowned for her religious tolerance and inclusive patronage. Although her husband Vishnuvardhana converted to Sri Vaishnavism under the influence of Ramanujacharya, Shantala Devi remained a devout patron of Jainism throughout her life. She is credited in inscriptional and local tradition with supporting the construction and endowment of Jain basadis at Shravanabelagola, Halebidu, and Belur.

Epigraphic evidence from the period records royal grants to Jain temples and monks, demonstrating her personal commitment to Jain traditions

Shantala Devi is also traditionally remembered for undertaking the Jain vow of "Sallekhana" (ritual fasting to death) at Shivagange in 1131 AD. An inscription of (1131 AD) at Chandragiri Hill in Shravanabelagola Clearly records her death through Sallekhana in the presence of Jain Monk "Prabhachandra-siddhanta-deva", her husband Vishnuvardhana, and her mother "Machikabbe". This inscription praises her piety, mentions grants she made to Jain temples, and details her family lineage.

According to local Karnataka traditions recorded in colonial-era gazetteers and Jain community histories, Shantala Devi was distressed by her husband's religious shift and spent extended periods at Shravanabelagola, a major Jain pilgrimage center. Some traditions claim that, grieving family tragedies—including the reported death of a son—and disillusioned with court politics, she eventually undertook Sallekhana (Jain ritual fasting unto death) at Shivagange.

== Legacy ==
Shantala Devi is remembered as a model of grace, artistic accomplishment, and religious pluralism. The Shantaleshwara temple at Halebidu is said to be named in her honor.

She remains a celebrated figure in Karnataka's cultural memory, appearing in modern Kannada novels, dance dramas, and scholarly studies as a symbol of art-loving queenship and tolerance across faiths.
