= Kalya inscriptions and hero stones =

Historic settlement in Karnataka, India

Kalya is a historic settlement located in Magadi Taluk, Bengaluru South district of Karnataka, India. Kalya as an early settlement can be attested by prehistoric rock art and tools reported from Kalya and inscriptional evidence in the village starting from 550 CE to the early 17th century CE, making it one of the few places in the country that has been continuously inhabited for 3000 to 3500 years.

Kalya has been variously documented as Kalleha, Kalyaha and Kalleha Pattana in the inscriptions, this village houses more than 28 documented inscriptions, three tiger-hunting hero stones, four Veera Masti stones, Nisidhi stones, a lingamudra stone, Kalleshwara temple, tomb of the famous 12th-century poet Palkuriki Somanatha, a Veerashaiva Jangam Mutt, Manasthamba, and icons of Buddhist, Jaina, Vaishnava, and Shaiva sects Alongside these historical remnants, Prehistoric rock art and tools have also been reported from Kalya, indicating that this village has been inhabited for approximately 3500–4000 years.

Kalya has also been identified with "bauddhavasapuri kalleha pattana", literally translated as "the Kalavavhithi city where Buddhists live" as documented in a copper plate inscription of Turuvekere by Dr Chidanandamurthy. The tomb of the famous 12th-century poet Palkuriki Somanatha, the author of the first biographical work on Basavanna, the Basava Purana, is in the village. The story of how he came about this village is mentioned in his own work and he says that enamored by the devotion of the shivasharane Sarvashile Chennamma, he came to the village to seek her blessings and decided to stay in the village upon the request of the saintess made Kalya his abode for the rest of his life.

== Kalya 1368 CE Jain-Srivaishnava conflict resolution Inscription ==
Kalya 1368CE Bukkaraya's Jain SriVaishanava Reconciliation Inscription
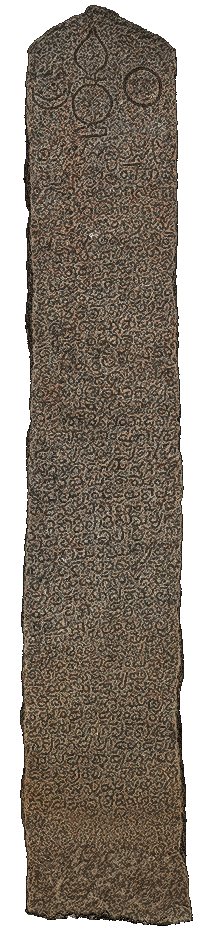
- Digital image obtained by 3D scanning of the Kalya 1368CE Bukkaraya's Jain SriVaishanava Reconciliation Inscription - Front Side

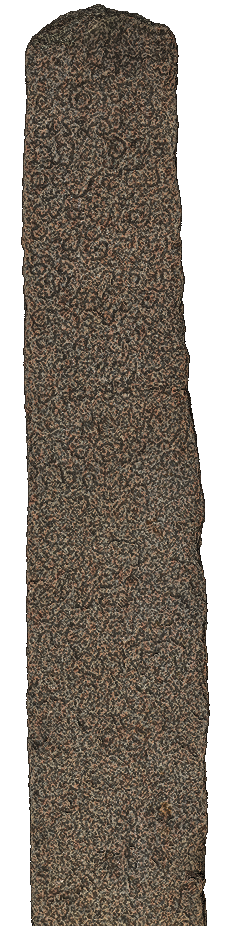
- Kalya 1368CE Bukkaraya's Jain SriVaishanava Reconciliation Inscription - Back Side
- Material: Stone
- Height: 208 cm (82 in)
- Width: 33 cm (13 in)
- Writing: Kannada
- Created: 1368 CE
- Discovered: 1902; Kalya, Magadi, Karnataka; 12.9797446°N 77.1796794°E
- Discovered by: B L Rice
- Language: Kannada
- https://mythicsociety.github.io/AksharaBhandara/#/learn/Shasanagalu?id=115056

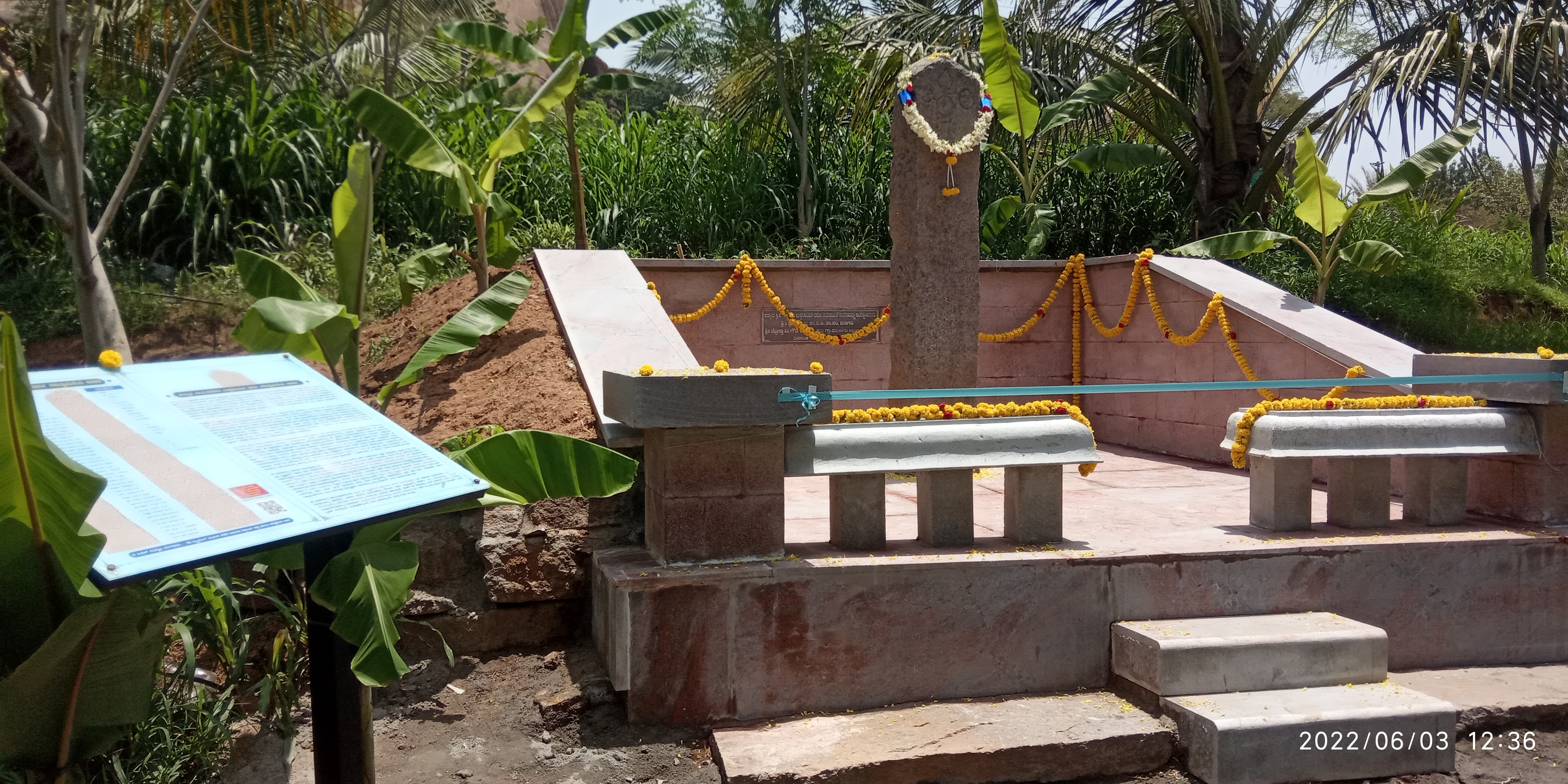
Wide Angle View Photograph of the Kalya 1368CE Bukkaraya's Jain SriVaishanava Reconciliation Inscription. Picture Courtesy: Wikimedia Commons

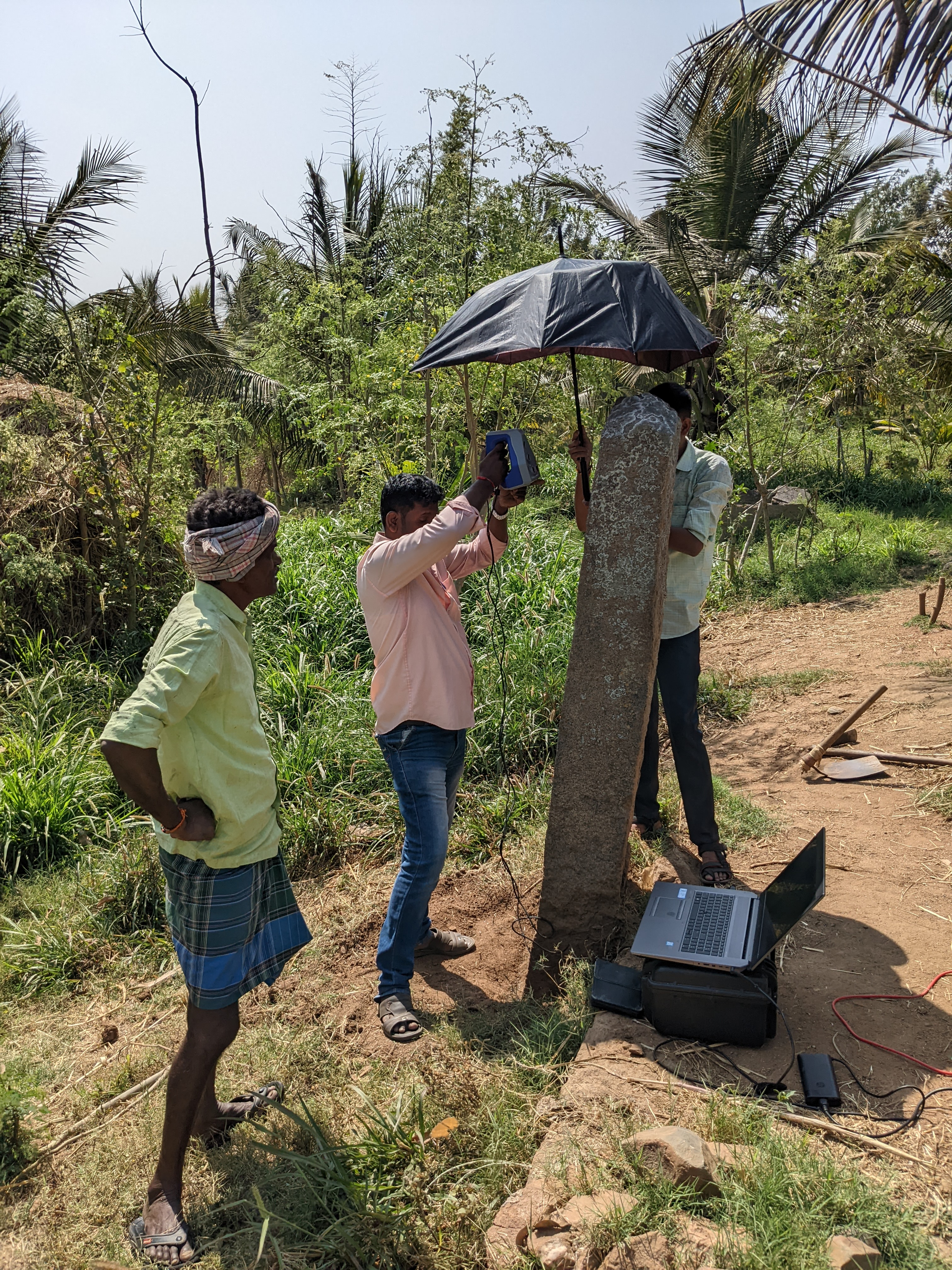
3D Scanning of the Kalya 1368CE Bukkaraya's Jain SriVaishanava Reconciliation Inscription. Picture Courtesy: Wikimedia Commons

It is one of the most remarkable inscription documented in Karnataka, it is a Kannada inscription dated to 1368 CE issued during the reign of Bukkaraya II. It records that a dialogue (saṃvāja) between Jains and the Srivaishnavas escalated into a fight and the Jains had been unjustly killed by the Srivaishnavas, this conflict was taken to the court of Bukkaraya II of the Vijayanagara Kingdom by the Jains of Anegondi, Penukonda, Hospattana and Kalya, this conflict was resolved by the king by ordering the Srivaishnavas of Tirumala, Tirunarayanapura (Melukote) and Srirangam to allow the rightful playing of the panchamahavadyas ( five great instruments ) in the Jain temples and that the Srivaishnavas had to issue decrees and install it in Jain temples following the order throughout the kingdom. The inscription starts with an invocatory verse on Ramanuja, ironically the verse praises Ramanuja as being a great subduer of the pāsaṇḍas (sramanas) and records the Srivaishnavas as bhakta, the imitation of this inscription was also erected in Shravanabelagola, it was put up after a month of being installed in Kalya. The inscription was documented and published in Volume 9, Epigraphia carnatica.

=== Transliteration of the inscription ===
The text of the inscription is published in Volume 9, Epigraphia Carnatica.

Line Number	Kannada	IAST
1	ಸ್ವಸ್ತಿ ಸಮಸ್ತ ಪ್ರ	svasti samasta pra
2	ಶಸ್ತಿ ಸಹಿತಂ|| ಪಾಷ	śasti sahitaṃ|| pāṣa
3	ಂಡ ಸಾಗರ ಮಹಾವಡವಾ	ṃḍa sāgara mahāvaḍavā
4	ಮುಖಾಗ್ನಿ ಶ್ರೀ ರಂಗರಾ	mukhāgni śrī raṃgarā
5	ಜ ಚರಣಾಂಬುಜ ಮೂ	ja caraṇāṃbuja mū
6	ಲದಾಸಃ ಶ್ರೀವಿಷ್ಣುಲೋಕ	ladāsaḥ śrīviṣṇuloka
7	ಮಣಿ ಮಂಟಪ ಮಾರ್ಗ	maṇi maṃṭapa mārga
8	ದಾಯೀ ರಾಮಾನುಜೋ ವಿಜಯ	dāyī rāmānujo vijaya
9	ತೇ ಯತಿರಾಜ ರಾಜಃ || ಶಕ ವ	te yatirāja rājaḥ || śaka va
10	ರ್ಷ ೧೨೯೦ನೆಯ ಕೀಲಕ ಸಂ	rṣa 1290neya kīlaka saṃ
11	ವತ್ಸರದ ಶ್ರಾವಣ ಶು ೨ ಸೋ	vatsarada śrāvaṇa śu 2 so
12	ದಲು ಶ್ರೀಮನ್ ಮಹಾಮಂ	dalu śrīman mahāmaṃ
13	ಡಳೇಶ್ವರಂ ಅರಿರಾಯ ವಿಭಾ	ḍaleśvaraṃ arirāya vibhā
14	ಡ ಭಾಷೆಗೆ ತಪ್ಪುವ ರಾ	ḍa bhāṣhege tappuva rā
15	ಯರಗಂಡ ಶ್ರೀವೀರ ಬುಕ್ಕ	yaragaṃḍa śrīvīra bukka
16	ರಾಯನು ಪ್ರಿತುವಿ ರಾಜ್ಯವ	rāyanu prituvi rājyava
17	ನಾಳುವ ಕಾಲದಲಿ ಜಇನ	nāluva kāladali jaina
18	ರಿಗೆ ಭಕ್ತರಿಗೆ ಸಂವಾಜವಾದ	rige bhaktarige saṃvājavāda
19	ಲ್ಲಿ ಆನೆಯಗೊಂದಿ ಹೊಸಪ	lli āneyagoṃdi hosapa
20	ಟ್ಟಣ ಪೆನುಗುಂಡೆ ಕಳ್ಯಹ	ṭṭaṇa penuguṃḍe kalyaha
21	ವೊಳಗಾದ ಸಮಸ್ತ ನಾಡ	volagāda samasta nāḍa
22	ಜಇನರು ಬುಕ್ಕರಾಯಂಗೆ ಭ	jainaru bukkarāyaṃge bha
23	ಕ್ತರು ಅನ್ಯಾಯದಲು ಕೊಲ್ಲು	ktaru anyāyadalu kollu
24	ವದನು ಬಿಂನಹಂ ಮಾಡ	vadanu biṃnahaṃ māḍa
25	ಲಾಗಿ ಕೋವಿಲ್ | ತಿರುಮಲೆ |	lāgi kovil | tirumale |
26	ಪೆರುಮಾ ಕೋವಿಲು | ತಿರುನಾ	perumā kovilu | tirunā
27	ರಾಯಣಪುರ ಮುಖ್ಯವಾ	rāyaṇapura mukhyavā
28	ದ ಸಕಳಾಚಾರ್ಯ್ಯರು ಸ	da sakalāchāryaru sa
29	ಕಳ ಸಮಯಿಗಳು ಸಕಳ	kala samayigalu sakala
30	ಸಾತ್ವಿಕರು ಮೋಷ್ಟಿಕರು ತಿ	sātvikaru moṣṭikaru ti
31	ರುಪಣಿ ತಿರುವಿಡಿ ತಂಣಿ	rupaṇi tiruviḍi taṃṇi
32	ರವರು ನಾಲ್ವತ್ತೆಂಟು ತಲೆ	ravaru nālvatteṃṭu tale
33	ಮಕ್ಕಳು ಸಾವಂತ ಬೋವ	makkalu sāvaṃta bova
34	ಕ್ಕಳು ತಿರಿಕುಲ ಜಾಂಬವಕುಲ	kkalu tirikula jāṃbavakula
35	ವೊಳಗಾದ ಪದಿನೆಂಟು ನಾಡಾ	volagāda padineṃṭu nāḍā
36	ಶ್ರೀವಇಷ್ಣವರ ಕಯ್ಯಲು ಮಹಾ	śrīvaiṣṇavara kayyalu mahā
37	ರಾಯನು ಜಇನರು ನಿಂಮ	rāyanu jainaru niṃma
38	ವಇಷ್ಣವ ದರುಸನದ ಮಱೆ ಒ	vaiṣṇava darusanada mare o
39	ಕ್ಕೆವುವೆಂದು ಕೊಟ್ಟ ಸಂಮಂಧ	kkeveṃdu koṭṭa saṃmaṃdha
40	ಪಂಚ ಬಸ್ತಿಗಳಲಿ ಕಳಸ ಜ	paṃca bastigaḻali kaḻasa ja
41	ಗಳೆ ಜಗಟೆ ಮೊದಲಾದ ಪಂ	gale jagaṭe modalāda paṃ
42	ಚ ಮಹಾವಾದ್ಯವೂ ಸಲು	ca mahāvādyavū salu
43	ಉದು ಅನ್ಯರಿ[ಗೆ] ಬರಕೂಡದು ಇ	udu anyari[ge] barakūḍadu i
44	ಜಇನ ಸಮಯಕೆ ಸಲುವು	jaina samayake saluvu
45	ದೆಂದು ಹಾನಿವ್ರಿದ್ಧಿಯಾದ .	deṃdu hānivriddhiyāda
46	. ಶ್ರೀವಇ	. śrīvai
47	ಷ್ಣವ ಸಮಯ	ṣṇava samaya
48	. . . . .	. . . . .
49	. . . ಯೀ	. . . . yi
50	ಮರ್ಯ್ಯಾದೆ	. maryyāde
51	. . . . .	. lu ellā rājya
52	ದೊಳಗುಳ	doḻaguḻḻa
53	ಬಸ್ತಿ .	basti
54	ಶ್ರೀವಇಷ್ಣವ	śrīvayiṣṇava
55	. . . . .	. . . . .
56	ನೆಟ್ಟು ಕೊಟ್ಟೆವು	neṭṭu koṭṭevu

== Kalya 14thcentury CE Mukkode Jina Shloka Inscription ==
It is a Kannada inscription dated to the 14th century CE. It consists of a verse from the Pramanasangraha, an 8th-century J

Kalya 14th-century Mukkode Jina Shloka Inscription
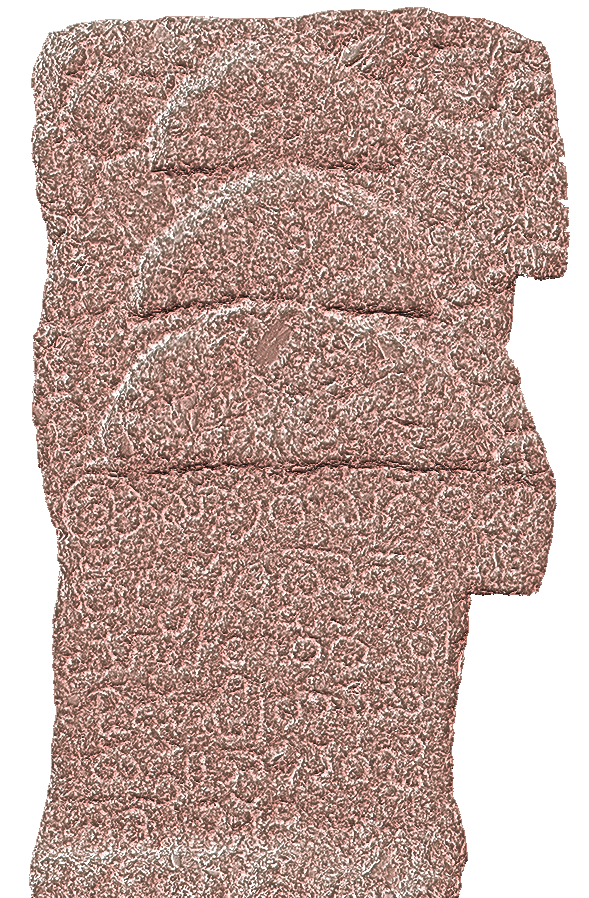
- Digital Image Obtained by 3D Scanning of The Kalya 14th-century Mukkode Jina Shloka Inscription
- Material: Stone
- Height: 95 cm (37 in)
- Width: 36 cm (14 in)
- Created: 14th Century
- Discovered: 2022
- Discovered by: The Mythic Society-Bengaluru Inscriptions 3D Digital Conservation Project
- Present location: 12.974667°N 77.184194°E
- Language: Kannada

ain composition authored by Akalanka.

=== Physical characteristics ===
The inscription is inscribed in the Kannada language and script. The inscription is 95 cm tall & 36 cm wide, while the characters are approximately 5.3 cm tall, 6.2 cm wide & 0.25 cm deep.

=== Transliteration of the inscription ===
The inscription was published in the Quaternary Journal of the Mythic society.

	Kannada	IAST
1	ಶ್ರೀ ಮತ್ಪರಮ ಗಂಭೀ	śrī matparama gaṃbhī
2	ರಂಸ್ಯಾದ್ವಾದ	raṃsyādvādā
3	ಮೋಘ ಲಾಂಛನಂ	mogha lāṃchanaṃ
4	ಜೀಯತ್ರೈಲೋಕ ನಾ	jīyātrailoka nā
5	ತಸ್ಯ ಶಾಸನಂ ಜಿ	thasya śāsanaṃ ji
6	ನ ಶಾಸನಂ	na śāsanaṃ

=== Translation ===
One translation is: "the most respectful, the most beautiful symbol of the syadvada doctrine, an inscription of the lord of the three worlds, and an inscription of the Jains."

== Kalya Kalleshwara Temple, 1536 CE, Singarajayya Divige-Harivana Donation Inscription ==
It is a Kannada inscription dated to March 22, 1536 CE and records the donation of rituals items to the god Kalleshwara by a Singarayya.

=== Physical characteristics ===
The inscription is inscribed in the Kannada language and script. The inscription is 102 cm tall and 244 cm wide (inscription area), while the characters are approximately 6.8 cm tall, 5.2 cm wide, and 0.3 cm deep.

=== Transliteration of the inscription ===
The transliteration is published in the Quaternary Journal of Mythic Society.

	Kannada	IAST
1	o ಕವ	o kava
2	೦ ದುರ್ಮತಿ ಸಂವತ್ಸರದ ಚಯಿತ್ರ ಶು ೧ ಲು ಶ್ರೀಮತು ಕಲ್ಲೇಶ್ವರಲಿಂಗನಿಗೆ	0 durmati saṃvatsarada cayitra śu 1 lu śrīmatu kalleśvaraliṃganigĕ
3	೦ ಸಿಂಗರಾಜಯ್ಯ ಮಾಡಿದ ಸೇವೆ ಹರಿವಾಣ . ಕಂಚಿನ ದೀವಿಗೆ	0 siṃgarājayya māḍida sevĕ harivāṇa . kaṃcina dīvigĕ
4	೦ ಕಂಬಿ(ಚಿ) . . . ಕಾಣಿ . . ದೀವಿಗೆ ೨ ಅ. . . . ಬಾರ . . ೧. . .	0 kaṃbi(ci) . . . kāṇi . . dīvigĕ 2 a. . . . bāra . . 1. . .
5	೦ ಹೊಲ.. ಅ..ಬಿಡಿಸಿದ . . . . . .	0 hŏla.. a..biḍisida . . . . . .
6	೦ . . . . ನೈವೇದ್ಯಕೆ . ಖ೧ ಮೆಲು . . . . . . . . . . . . .	0 . . . . naivedyakĕ . kha1 mĕlu . . . . . . . . . . . . .

== Kalya Kalleshwara Temple 1540CE Singaraja's Timmaraja Donation Inscription ==
Kalya Kalleshwara Temple 1536CE Singarajayya Divige- Harivana Donation Inscription
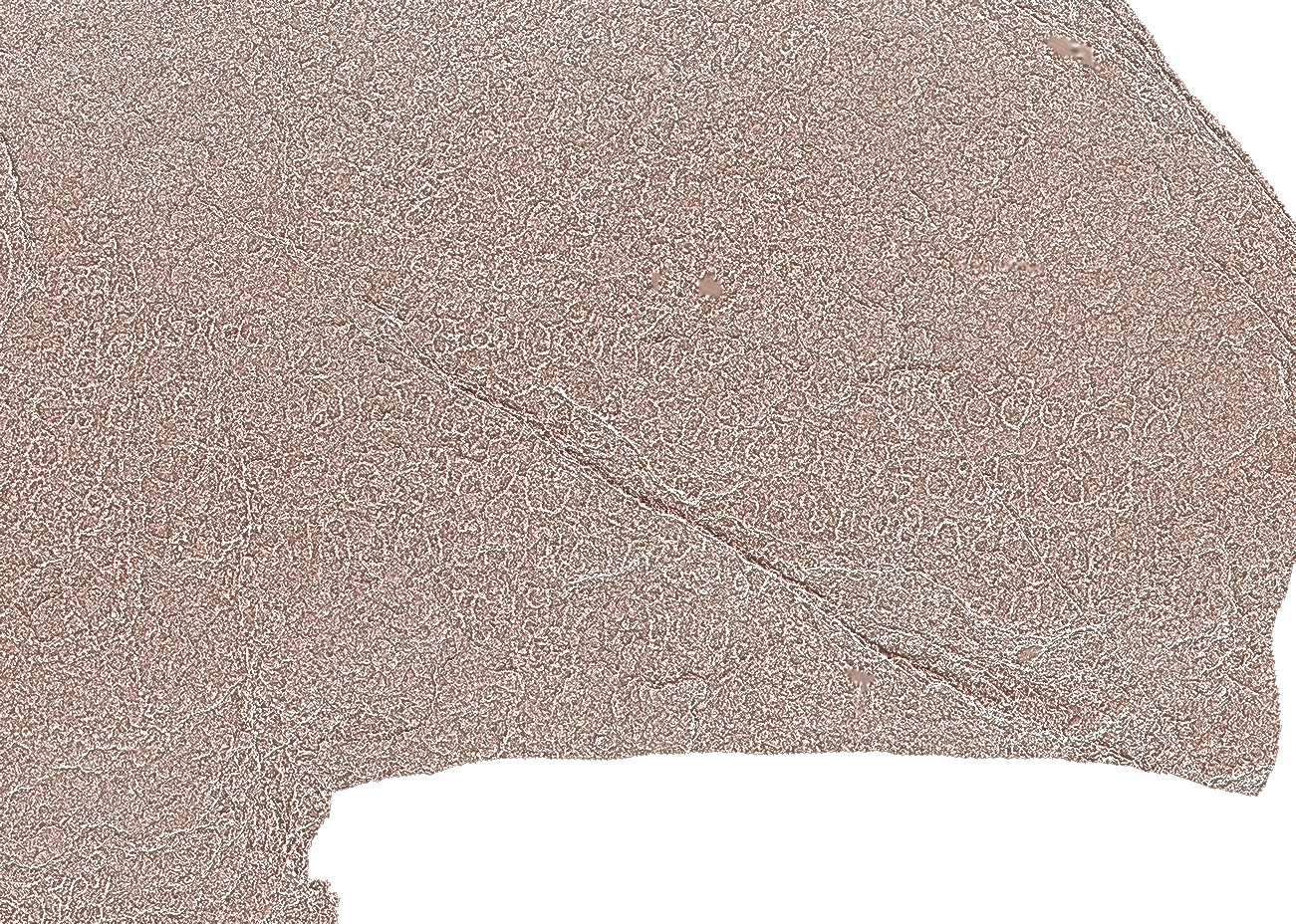
- Digital Image Obtained by 3D Scanning of The Kalya Kalleshwara Temple 1536CE Singarajayya Divige- Harivana Donation Inscription
- Material: Stone
- Height: 102 cm (40 in)
- Width: 244 cm (96 in)
- Writing: Kannada
- Created: 15-Mar-1536 (490 years ago)
- Discovered: 2022
- Discovered by: The Mythic Society-Bengaluru Inscriptions 3D Digital Conservation Project
- Present location: 12.978972°N 77.179111°E
- Language: Kannada

It is a Kannada inscription dated to 1540 CE paleographically. It records land grants to the god Kalleshwara by a Singaraja, it indicates the area of land donated and other particulars. Interestingly, interestingly it records the land as being donated on the orders of the deity Kalleshwara himself instead of the local ruler or king, indicating the people's recognition of the god Kalleshwara as a legitimate authority over the land. Many Indian kings and kingdoms were ruled under the name of the god, rulers positing themselves as the true representatives of such a god, the Travancore kingdom, Kashi were some places that were ruled under this norm. It was discovered by the Mythic Society Bengaluru Inscriptions 3D Digital Conservation Project team.

=== Physical characteristics ===
The inscription is inscribed in Kannada language and script. The inscription stone measures 91 cm tall & 301 cm wide , while the characters are approximately 8.1 cm tall, 9.3 cm wide & 0.4 cm deep.

=== Transliteration of the inscription ===
	Kannada	IAST
1	ಲಕ್ಕಪ್ಪ ಗೋಪಿನಾಥ ಅರಸರ ಮಗ ತಿಮ್ಮರಾಜನಿಗೆ ವಾಮನ ಮುದ್ರೆ ಮುಡಣ ಕಲ್ಲು	lakappa gopinātha ārāsara māga tiṃmarājarigĕ vāmana mudrĕ khalla muḍaṇa
2	ಹಳೆಯಾ ಉರು ಕುಪ್ಪಯ ಹೊಲ ಖ೧ ಘದೆ ಕೆಱೆಯ ಕೆಳಗೆ ಕ ೧ ಅರೋಭರು ಅಳುಪ ಸಲ್ಲದು ಕಲಿಸ್ವರ ದೇ	halĕyā uru kuppaya ̤ hŏla kha1 ghadĕ kĕṟĕya kĕlagĕ ka ̤ 1 arobharu alupa ̤ salladu kalisvara de
3	ವರ ನಿರುಪದಿಂ ಸಿಂಗರಾಜಗಳು ದನಾ ದರಪೂರ್ವ	vara nirupadiṃ siṃgarājagalu danā ̤ darapūrva
4	ಕವಾಗಿ ಖೊಟೆಉ ಚಾವಡಿವೀರೆಗೌಡನ	kavāgi khŏṭĕu cāvaḍivīrĕgauḍana
5	ಬರಹ ಯೀ ಗ್ರಾಮಕ್ಕೆ ಅಳುಪಿದವರು ವರಾಣಸಿಯಲ	baraha yī grāmakkĕ alupidavaru ̤ varāṇasiyali
6	ಗೋವ ಕೊಂ	gova kŏṃ
7	ದ ಪಾಪಕ್ಕೆ	da pāpakkĕ
8	ಹೋಹರು	hoharu

== The Kalya Kalleshwara Temple 1549 CE Immadi Inscription ==
This incomplete Kannada inscription is dated to 1549CE, with the content available, it possibly pertains to a grant by a king, the mention of the word "immadi" in other inscriptions including this, indicates that this was a donation by Immadi Kempegowda of the Yelahanka Naadaprabhu dynasty under the Karnataka (Vijayanagara) empire. It was discovered by The Mythic Society Bengaluru Inscriptions 3D Digital Conservation Project team.

=== Physical characteristics ===
The inscription is inscribed in Kannada language and script and is dated to the 1549CE. The inscription stone measures 82 cm tall by 112 cm wide, while the characters themselves are approximately 11.1 cm tall, 7.2 cm wide & 0.3 cm deep.

=== Transliteration of the inscription ===
	Kannada	IAST
1	೦ ಕೀಲಕ ಸಂವಶ್ಚರದ	0 kīlaka saṃvaścarada
2	೦ ಪುಷ್ಯ ಶುದ್ಧ೧ಲೂ ಶ್ರೀ	0 puṣya śuddha1lū śrī
3	೦ ಮತು ಯಿಂಮಡಿ	0 matu yiṃmaḍi
4	೦ . . . . . . . . .	0 . . . . . . . . .
5	೦ . .ಶ . . . .	0 . .śa . . . .
6	೦ . . . . . . . . . .	0 . . . . . . . . . .

== The Kalya Kalleshwara Temple 17th century Mahabhaktha Inscription ==
Kalya Kalleshwara Temple 17th-century Mahabhakta Inscription
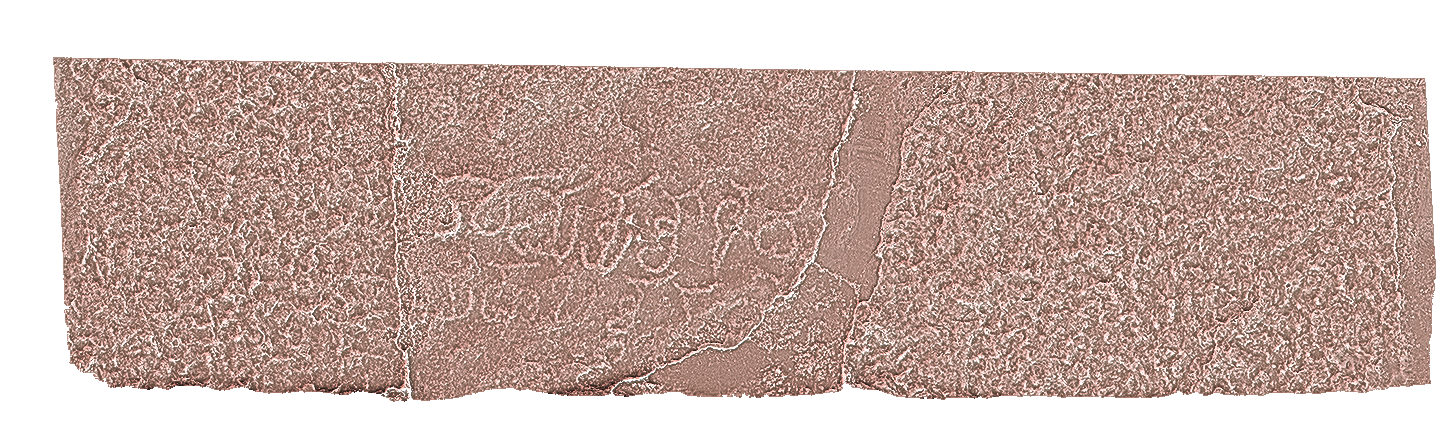
- Digital Image Obtained by 3D Scanning of The Kalya Kalleshwara Temple 17th-century Mahabhakta Inscriptio
- Material: Stone
- Height: 36 cm (14 in)
- Width: 144 cm (57 in)
- Writing: Kannada
- Created: 17th Century
- Discovered: 2022
- Discovered by: The Mythic Society-Bengaluru Inscriptions 3D Digital Conservation Project
- Present location: 12.978972°N 77.179111°E
- Language: Kannada

It is an incomplete Kannada inscription dated paleographically to the 17th century CE, it records a great devotee (mahabhakta) of the god Kalleshwara, his name possibly starts with "Talada". The Inscription was discovered by The Mythic Society Bengaluru Inscription 3D Digital Conservation Project team.

=== Physical characteristics ===
The inscription is inscribed in both Kannada language and script and is dated to the 17th Century. The inscription stone measures 36 cm tall by 144 cm wide (on the steps leading to Kalleshwara Temple), while the characters themselves are approximately 8.9 cm tall, 3.8 cm wide & 0.4 cm deep

=== Transliteration of the Inscription ===
The inscription is a total of two lines.

	Kannada	IAST
1	ಶ್ರೀಮತು ತಾಳದ .	śrīmatu tāl̤ada .
2	ಮಹ ಬಕ್ತ . .	maha bakta . .

== Kalya Kalleshwara Temple 16th century CE Mandala Inscription ==
It is a very worn-out Kannada inscription, the legible text indicates a grant to the siddas of God (Kalleshwara). A tantric mandala symbol is beside the inscription. The Inscription was discovered by The Mythic Society Bengaluru Inscription 3D Digital Conservation Project team.

=== Physical characteristics ===
The inscription is inscribed in Kannada language and script. The inscription stone is 103 cm tall & 186 cm wide, while the characters are approximately 6.8 cm tall, 5.3 cm wide & 0.3 cm deep.

=== Transliteration of the Inscription ===
	Kannada	IAST
1	. . ರ ದೇವರ . .ಸಿದರಿಗೆ	. . ra devara. .sidarige

== Kalya Kalleshwara Temple 16th century CE Ballabatta Boulder Inscription ==
It is a Kannada inscription dated to 18-July-1531 (Julian). Much of the text is effaced, the legible text indicates a possible land grant by a ballalbatta the god (Kalleshwara).

=== Physical characteristics ===
The inscription is inscribed in Kannada language and script. The inscription is 57 cm tall & 117 cm wide, while the characters are approximately 6.6 cm tall, 8.2 cm wide & 0.6 cm deep.

=== Transliteration of the Inscription ===
	Kannada	IAST
1	o ಖರ ಸಂವತ್ಸರದ ಆಶಡ	0 khara saṃvatsarada āśaḍa
2	o ಸುದ ೫ಲ್ಲು ಬಲ್ಲಬಟ್ಟ	0 suda 5llu ballabaṭṭa
3	o ಯ ದೇವರಿಗೆ ಚುಡಪ ಗ	0 ya devarigĕ cuḍapa ga
4	o ಡ	0 ḍa

== Gallery ==
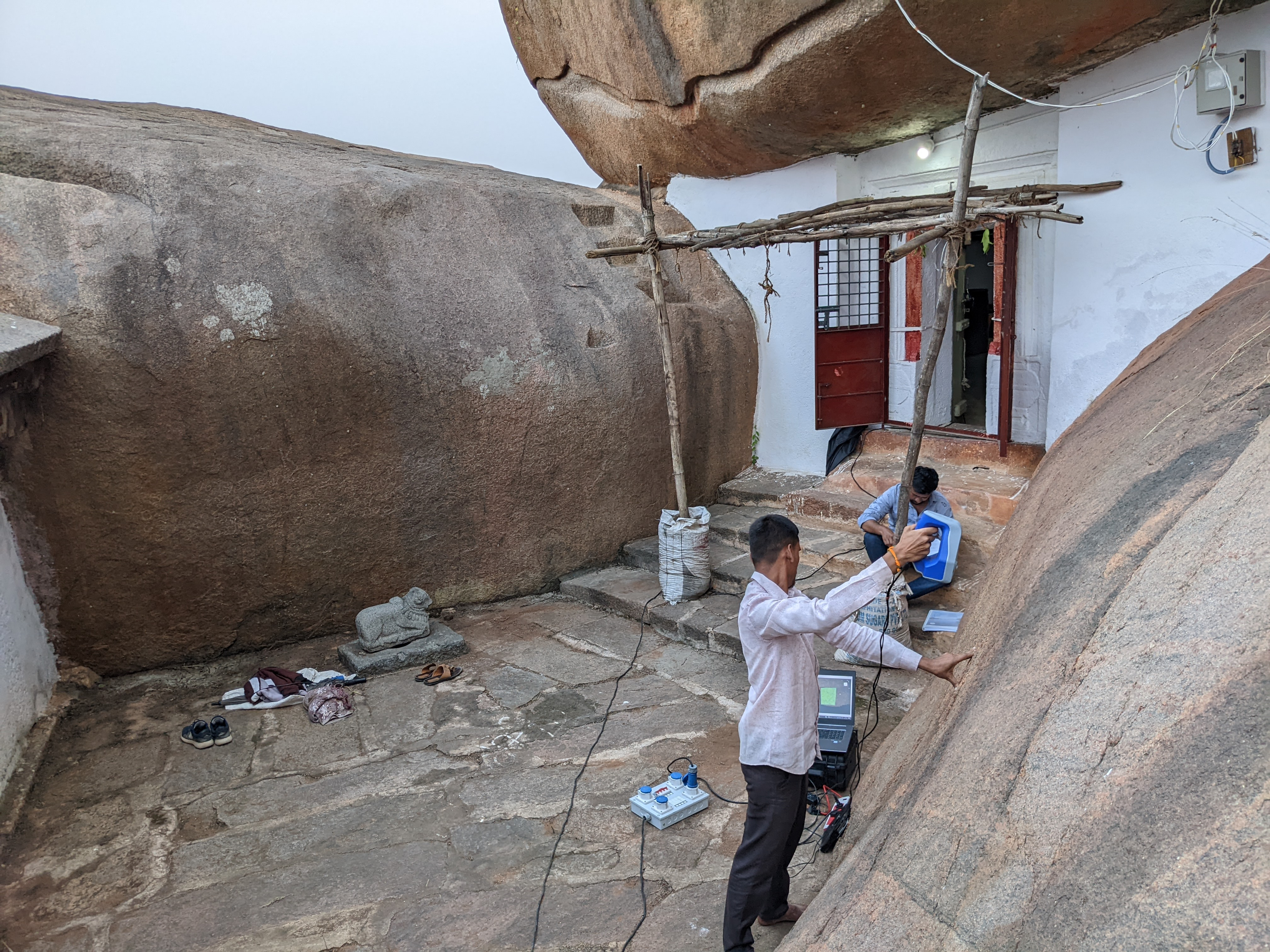
3D scanning of the Kalya Kalleshwara Temple North Boulder Inscription

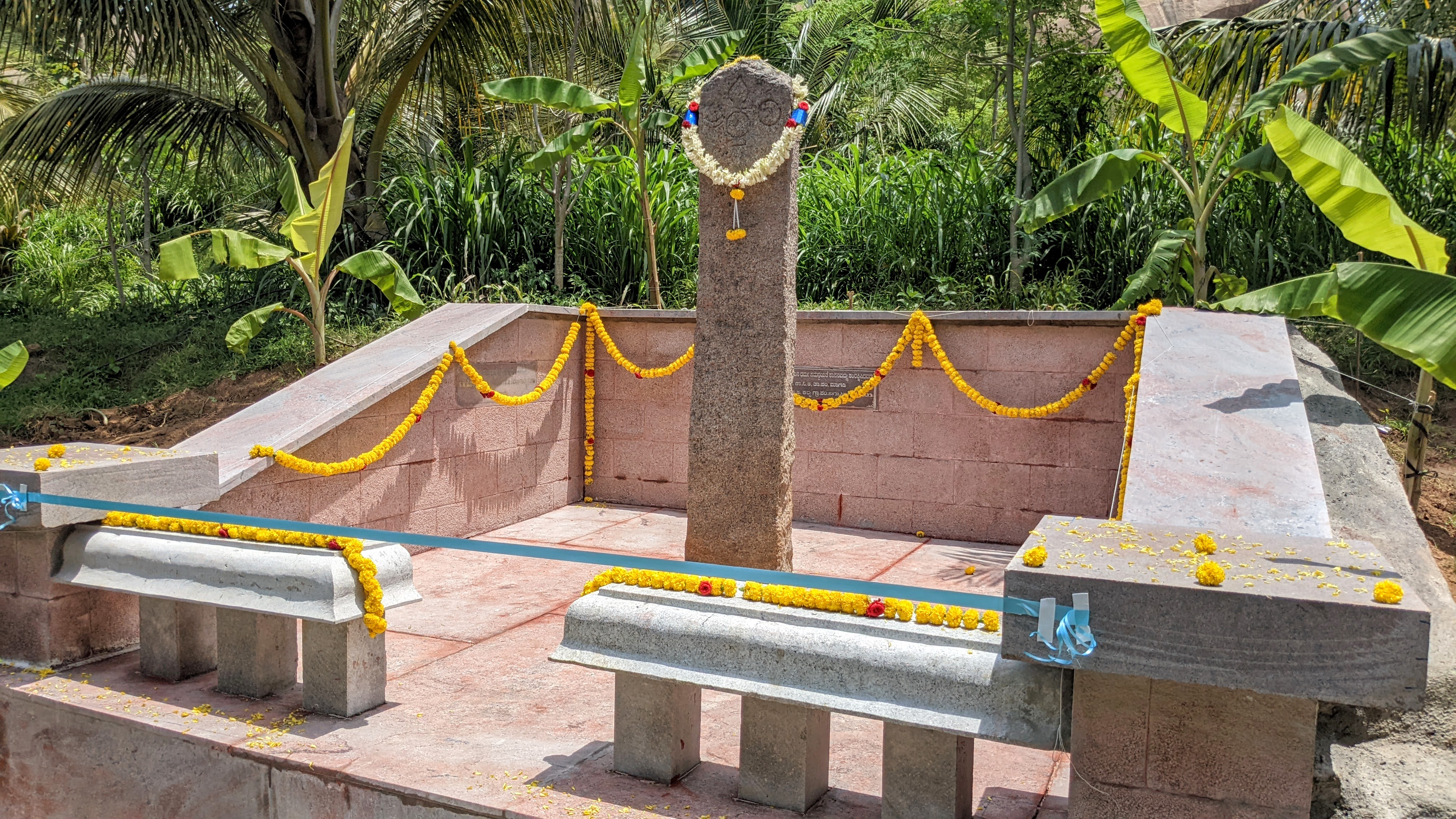
Kalya 1368CE Bukkaraya inscription

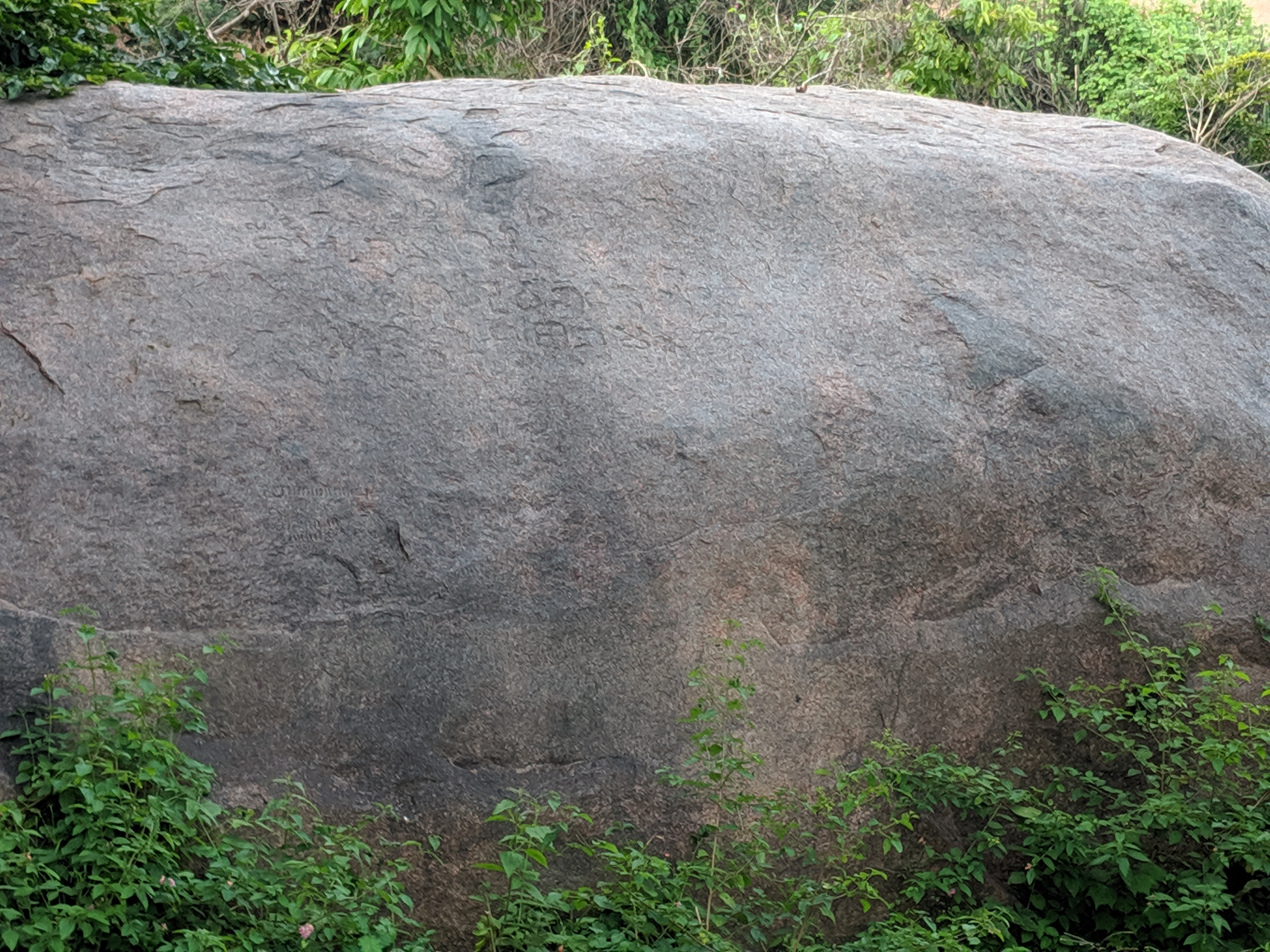
Kalya 550CE Inscription

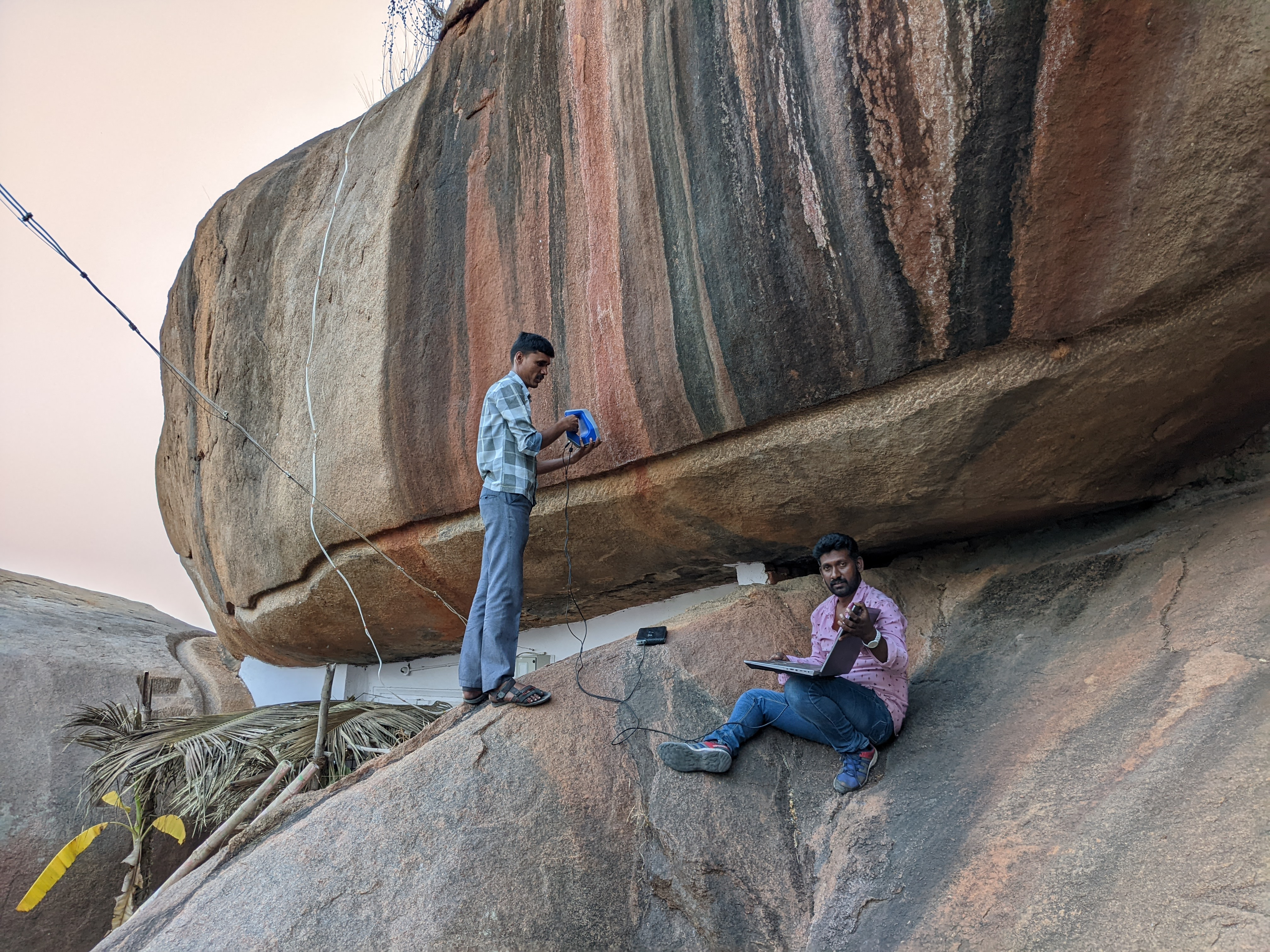
3D scanning of the Kalya Kalleshwara Temple 16th-century Mahanta Inscription

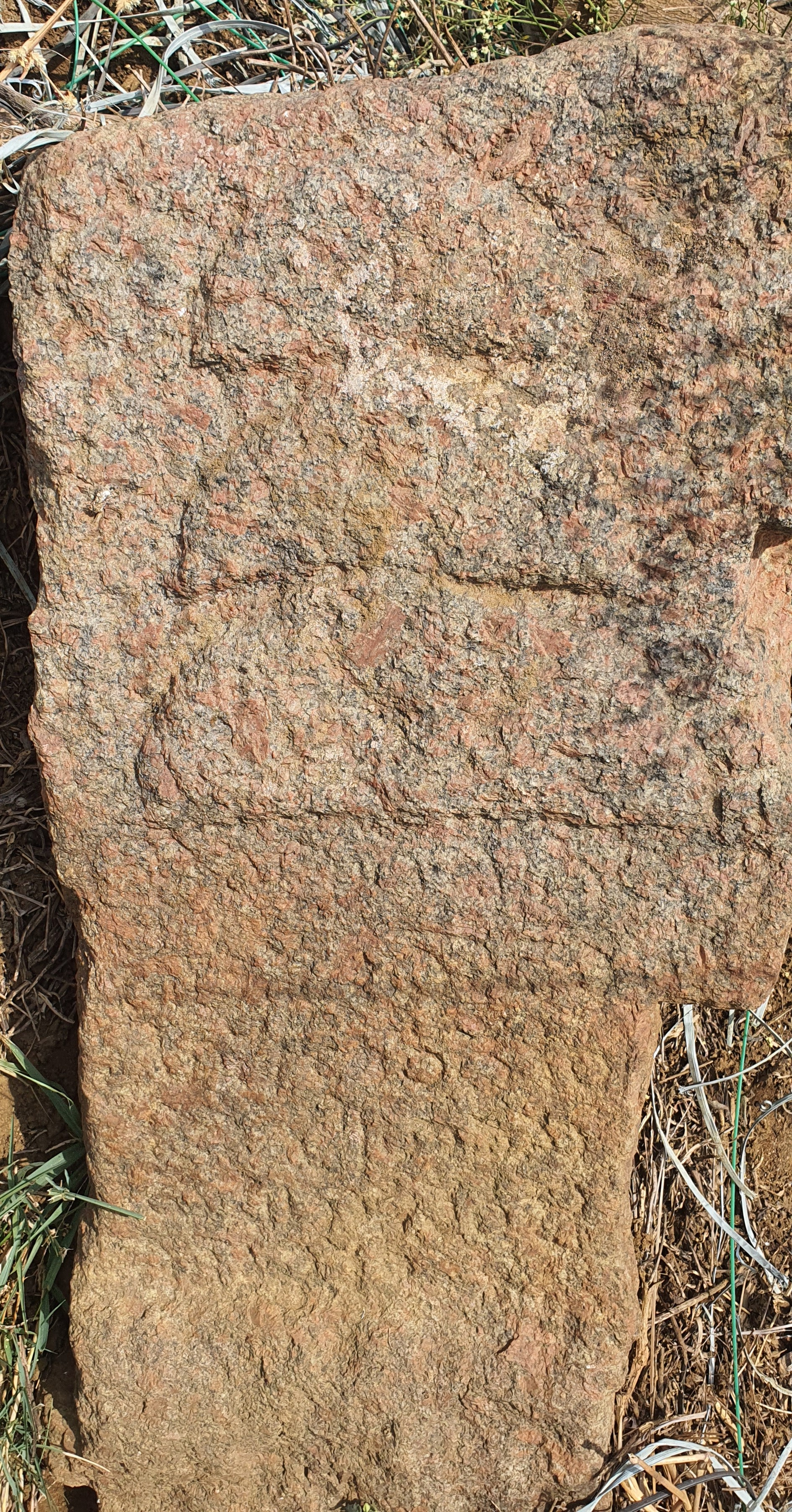
The Kalya 14th-century Mukkode Jina Shloka Inscription

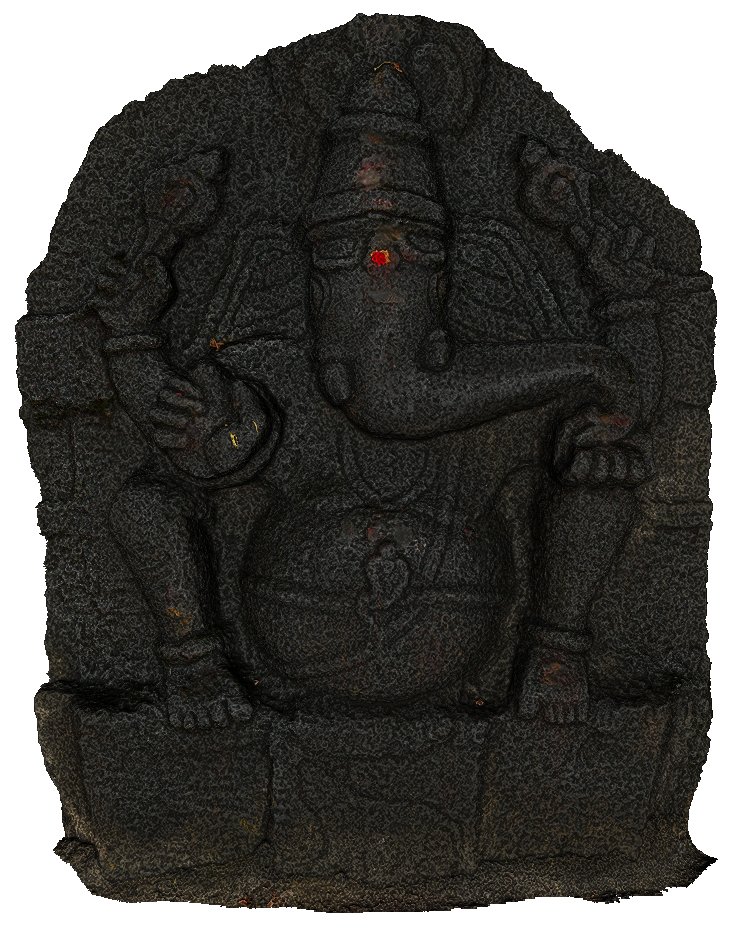
Digital Image of the Kalya 14-16Th Century Ganesha Sculpture

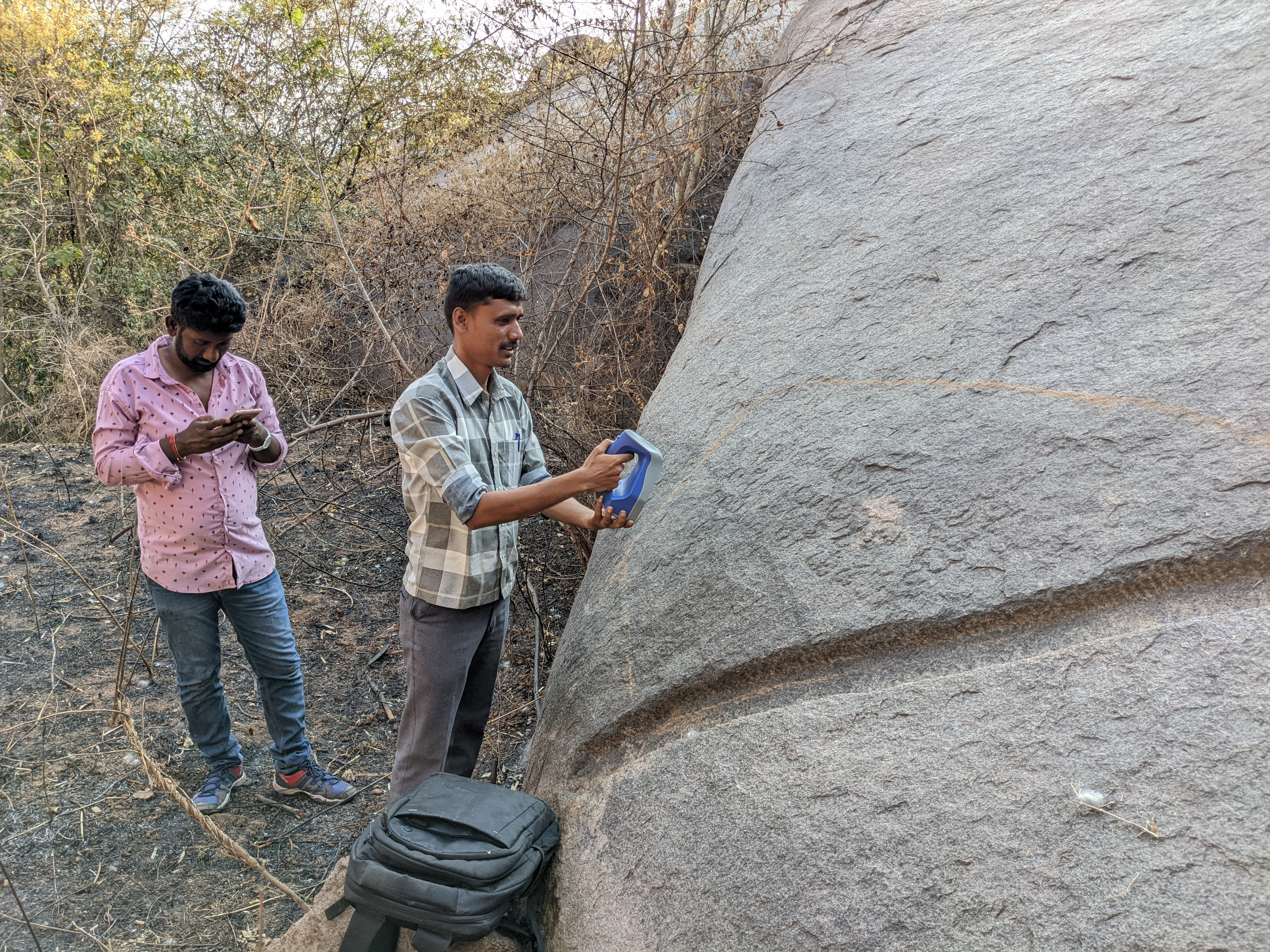
3D scanning of the Kalya Kalleshwara Temple 16th-century Ballabatta Boulder Inscription

== See also ==
- Kannada inscriptions
- Historical Monuments of Magadi
- Early Indian epigraphy
- History of Bangalore
- Jainism
- History of Jainism
- Jainism in Karnataka
- Sankighatta Jain temple
