= Ajjahalli, Magadi =

Ajjahalli
- village
- Ajjahalli, Magadi is in Bengaluru South district
- Country: India
- State: Karnataka
- District: Bengaluru South
- Talukas: Magadi

Government
  - Body: Village Panchayat

Languages
  - Official: Kannada
- Time zone: UTC+5:30 (IST)
- Nearest city: Bengaluru
- Civic agency: Village Panchayat

Ajjahalli, Magadi is a village in the southern state of Karnataka, India. It is located in the Magadi taluk of Bengaluru South district.

== See also ==
- Bengaluru South district
- Districts of Karnataka
