= Magadi =

Town in Karnataka, India

Magadi Mahagadi
- Town
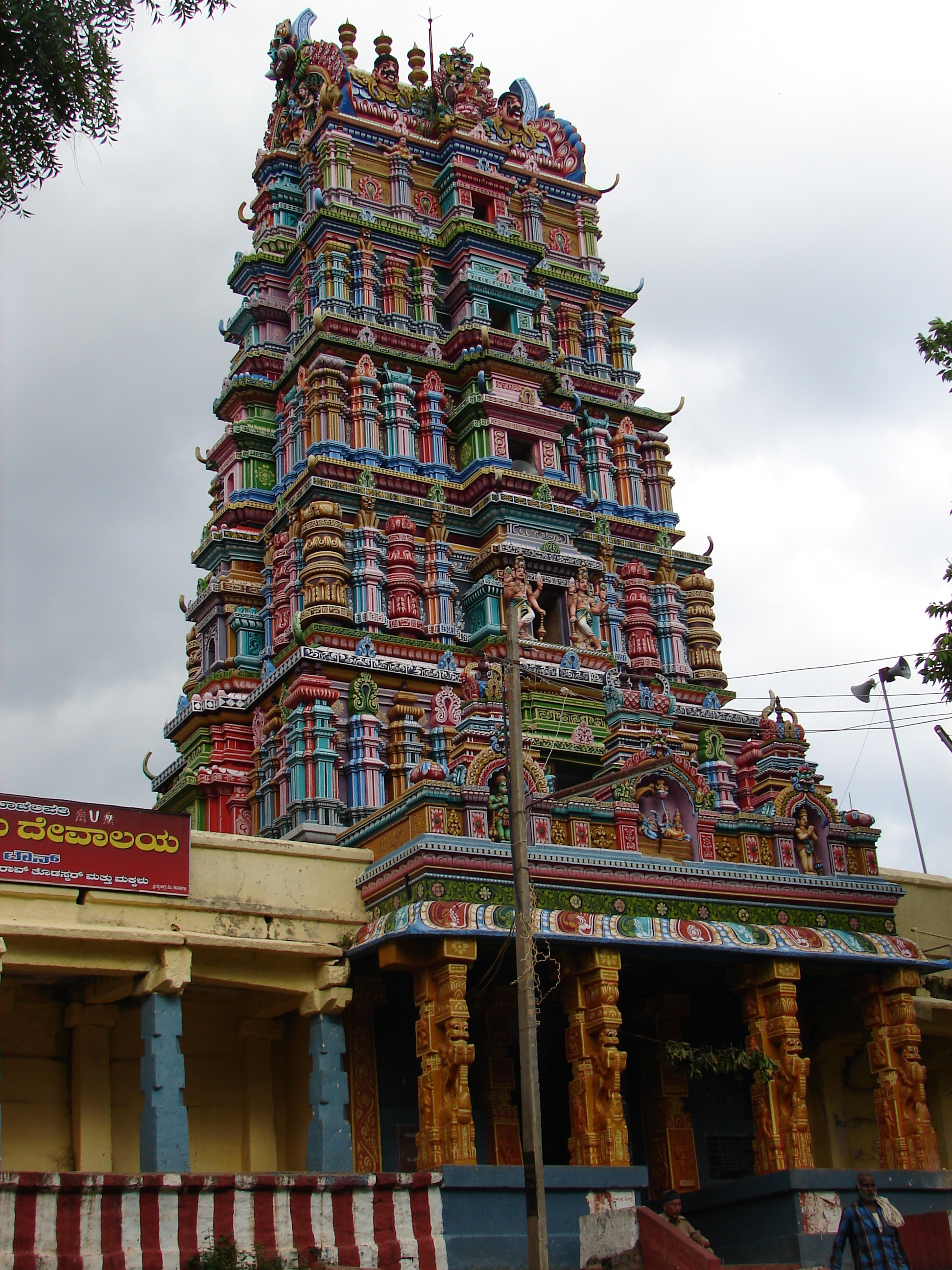
- Ranganatha Swamy temple
- Nickname: The leopard country
- Location in Karnataka, India Magadi (India)
- Coordinates: 12.97°N 77.23°E
- Country: India
- State: Karnataka
- District: Bengaluru South
- Founder: Kempegowda

Government
  - Body: Town Municipal Council

Area
  - Town: 5 km^{2} (1.9 sq mi)
  - Rural: 794 km^{2} (307 sq mi)
- Elevation: 895 m (2,936 ft)

Population (2011)
  - Town: 27,605
  - Density: 5,500/km^{2} (14,000/sq mi)
  - Rural: 176,236

Languages
  - Official: Kannada
- Time zone: UTC+5:30 (IST)
- PIN: 562120
- Vehicle registration: KA-42
- Website: http://www.magaditown.mrc.gov.in

Magadi is a town and taluk located in Bengaluru South District, Karnataka, India.

== History ==
As per a legend, Magadi was founded in 1139 by a Chola king, who, in the course of an expedition, heard that in early times it had been the residence of some saints. Magadi later passed into the hands of Hoysalas, before it became a part of the Vijayanagara Empire. The town was expanded in area during the reign of Achyuta Deva Raya, who had appointed Samanta Raya to manage the affairs of the district that Magadi was a part of. Samanta Raya received the town as a grant from the king in return for his fortification of Savandurga, who had it possession from 1543 to 1571, before it was passed on to his son Sampaja Raya. Attempts to plunder the town by Gangappa Nayak, a watchman during Chikka Raya's reign, was thwarted by Kempe Gowda I, who put him to death, before taking over the town. Gowda later retired to Magadi and the town came to associated with his family in the years to come.

Epigraphically, the history of Magadi is much earlier as the earliest epigraphical document is from the Kalya village dated paleographically to the 550 CE. It is documented in Akshara Bhandara, a digital compendium of Kannada inscriptions by the Mythic society. The inscriptions of Magadi are mostly documented in Volume 9 of Epigraphia carnatica, recently discovered inscriptions are published in journals like Itihasa darpana and the journals of Mythic Society. Among the significant inscriptions is the Vaishnava-Jaina conflict resolution inscription documented in the Kalya village, dated to 1368 CE, that records the conflict between the followers of the two religions and the subsequent resolution of it by king Bukkaraya II.

Magadi was captured by the Mysore army in 1728 and the chief carried prisoner to Srirangapatna, where he died, the last of his line. The 1875 Gazetteer of Bangalore noted the population of Magadi to be around 4,000 and that it comprised 650 houses.

== Geography ==
Magadi is located at 12.97°N 77.23°E. It has an average elevation of 925 metres (3034 feet).

== Demographics ==
As of 2011 India census, Magadi had a population of 27,605. Males constitute 50% of the population and females 50%. Magadi has an average literacy rate of 69%, male literacy is 74%, and female literacy is 65%.

== Notable people ==
- Siddalingaiah, Kannada poet

== See also ==
- Ajjahalli, Magadi
- Ajjanahalli, Magadi
- Kalya Inscriptions
- Sankighatta
- Kenchahunasepalya
- Monuments at Magadi
