= Shivagange =

Mountain in Karnataka, India

Coordinates: 13.16970°N 77.22265°E

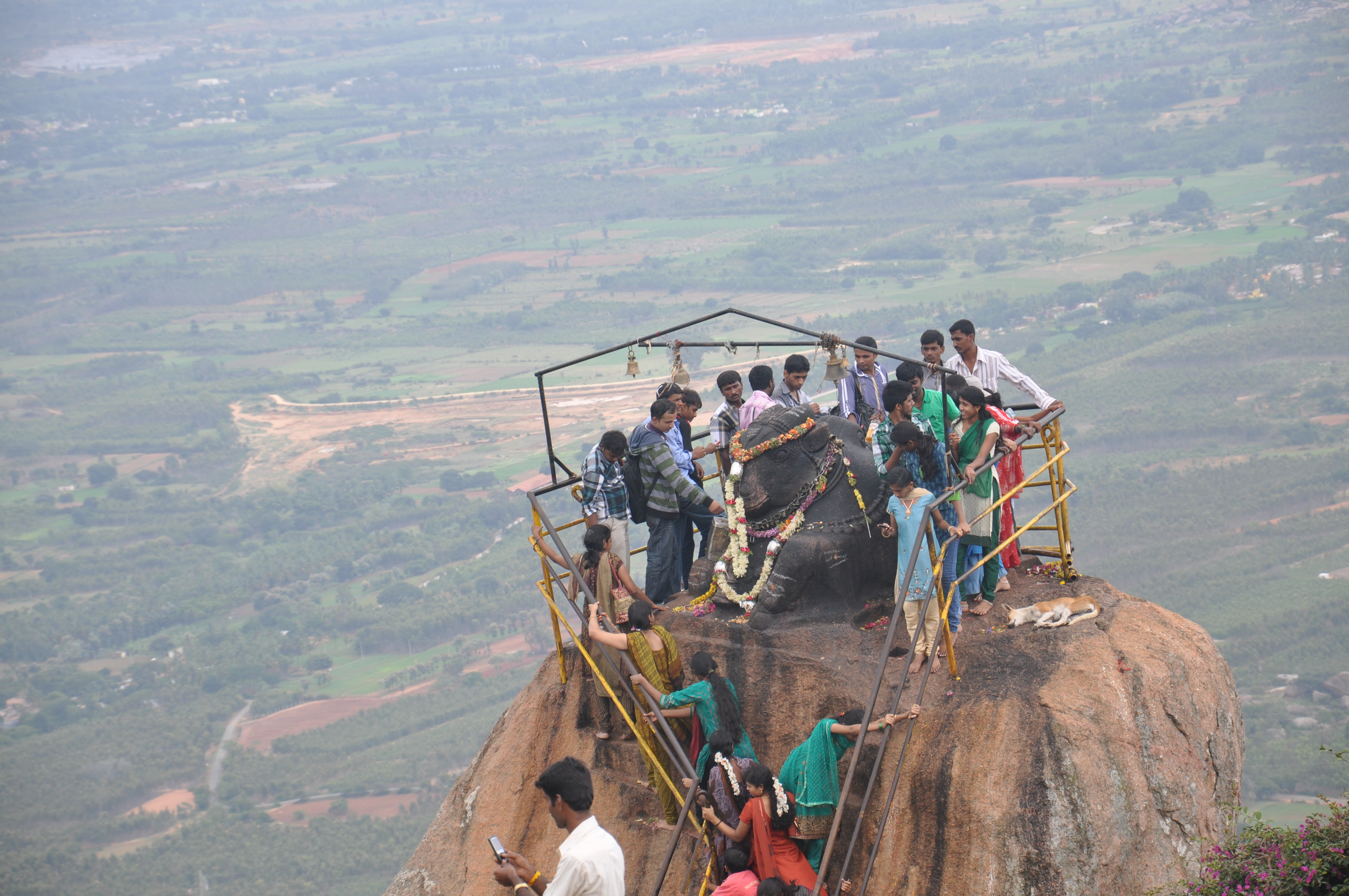

Shivagange is a mountain peak with a height of 1,368 metres (4,488 ft) and Hindu pilgrimage center And Also historically, it was an Ancient Jain site during the rule of The Hoysala and Ganga Dynasty. located near Dobbaspet, in Bengaluru Rural district, India. It is 25 km (16 mi) from the town of Tumakuru and 54 km (34 mi) from Bengaluru. The sacred mountain is shaped as a shivalinga and a spring flows near locally called "Ganga", thereby giving the place its name. It is also known as Dakshina Kashi (Kashi of the South) and has various temples such as Gangadhareshwara temple, Sri Honnammadevi Temple, Olakal Teertha, Nandi Statue, Patalagang Sharadambe temple and several theerthas such as Agasthya theertha, Kanva theertha, Kapila theertha, Pathala Gange.

The hill is also historically significant as the place where Hoysala queen Shantala Devi is believed to have undertaken the Jain ritual of Sallekhana (ritual fasting unto death) in 1131 CE, as recorded in an inscription at Chandragiri Hill in Shravanabelagola.

== History ==
Sivaganga is a sacred hill with a height of 4,559 feet above the level of the sea. Its outline appears from the east as a bull, from the west as a Ganesha, from the north as a serpent, and from the south as a linga. The number of steps leading to the top is said to equal the number of yojanas to Banaras (Varanasi).Hence this is called Dakshina Kashi. An ascent to the top is considered as a pilgrimage to the holy city.

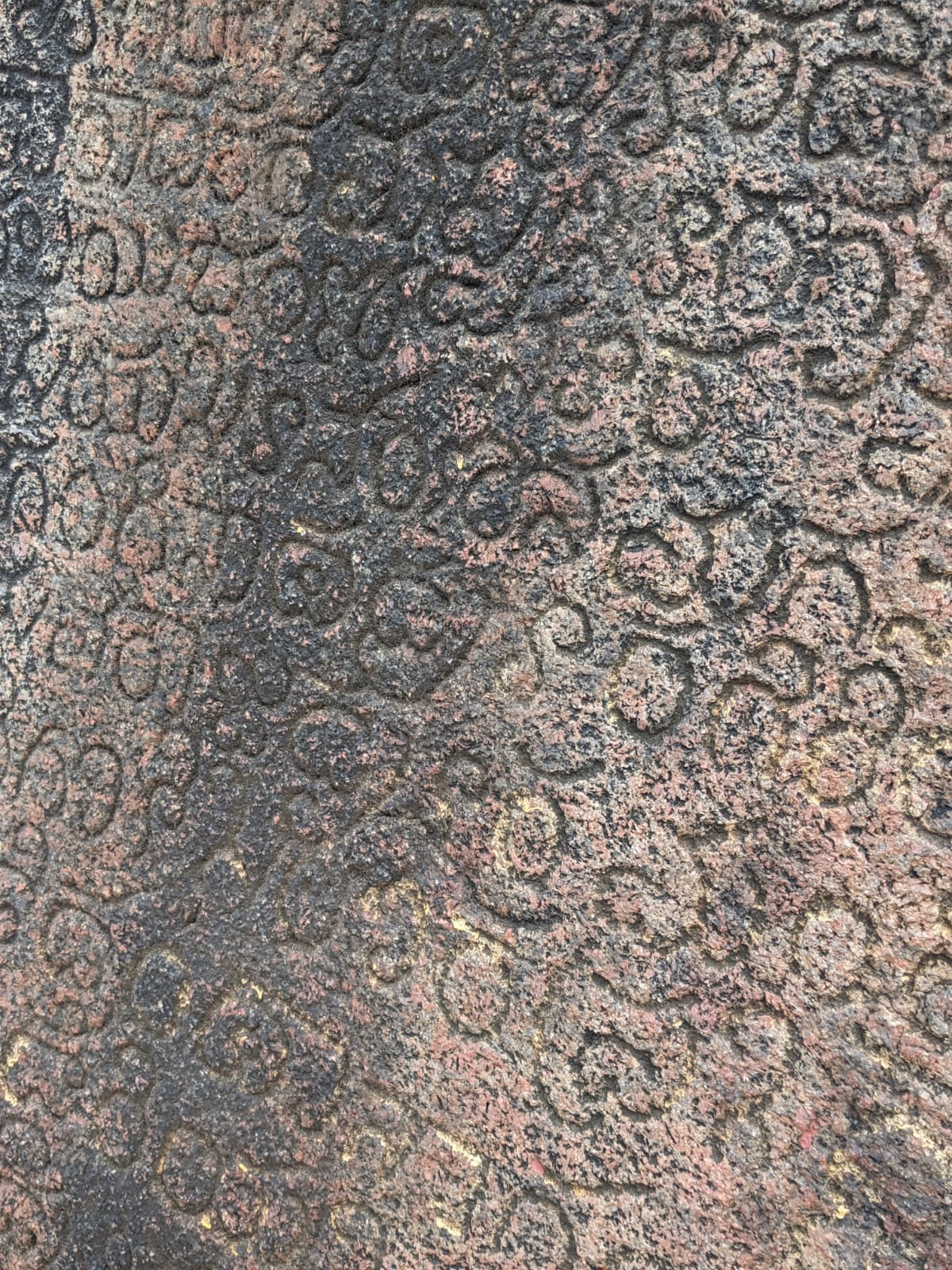
A (presumably) Halegannada inscription just below the Sutta Basava idol

It is says that Before the 12th century, Shivaganga was an important Jain site, with the presence of several Jain monks recorded in inscriptions and local traditions. During the Bhakti movement and subsequent religious shifts, the site gradually came under the influence of other faiths.

Hoysala Queen Shantala Devi is believed to have undertaken the Jain ritual of Sallekhana (voluntary peaceful death) at Shivagange in 1131 CE. An inscription dated 1131 CE at Chandragiri Hill in Shravanabelagola Clearly records her death through Sallekhana in the presence of Jain acharya "Prabhachandra Siddhantadeva", King Vishnuvardhana, and her mother "Macchikabbe". and Some scholars suggest that her decision was influenced by the mysterious death of her son, increasing political instability, and religious transitions within the Hoysala kingdom during that period.

The puranas give it the name of Kakudgiri. It is mentioned by its present name in the 12th century as one of the distant points to which the Lingayat faith established by Basava, the minister of Bijjala II, king of Kalyana

The hill was fortified during the 16th century by Shivappa Nayaka. These fortifications currently lie in ruins. The founder of Bengaluru, Magadi Kempegowda, also made improvements to the fortifications and kept a portion of his treasure within it.

A month-long cattle fair is held during Sankranthi month (around January) every year, which is a market place for bullocks.

== Beliefs surrounding the Gavi Gangadhareshwara Temple in Bengaluru ==
Followers believe an interesting miracle happens when abhisheka is performed on Shivalinga with ghee, the ghee turning to butter. It is claimed by the devotees/believers that this ghee has medicinal powers and can cure many ailments. According to legend there exists a secret tunnel that extends from the sanctum sanctorum (Garba Griha) of this temple to the Gavi Gangadhareshwara temple in Bengaluru, around 50 km (31 mi) away.

== River Kumudvathi ==
River Kumudvathi has its origin in the Shivagange hills and it is a tributary of river Arkavati. The Kumudvathi river flows across 278 villages covering 460 km^{2} (180 sq mi) encompassing major part of Nelamangala Taluk, Bengaluru Rural District and parts of Magadi Taluk, Ramanagra district. Due to various factors like deforestation, unsustainable extraction of ground water, soil erosion, encroachments and eucalyptus plantations the river has dwindled in size. This has resulting in serious water crisis for drinking and agriculture in all the villages under the river basin. However, projects and efforts are underway to revive the river.

== Trekking ==
The area is a popular site for rock climbing in the Karnataka state. The entire trail to the peak is well marked and the presence of human-made steps (often carved into the rocky landscape, but sometimes made from rocks) makes the trail suitable for beginners. There are frequent rest opportunities with stalls serving food and drinks. The trekking path to reach summit from foothills is of 6 km (3.7 mi) in a pre-defined path. The trail becomes steep and narrow near the summit of the mountain - safety rails are provided in such areas. Monkeys are the main fauna inhabiting the hill.

== Protected monument ==
The temple shrine is a protected monument under the Karnataka Ancient and Historical Monuments and archaeological sites and remains act 1962.

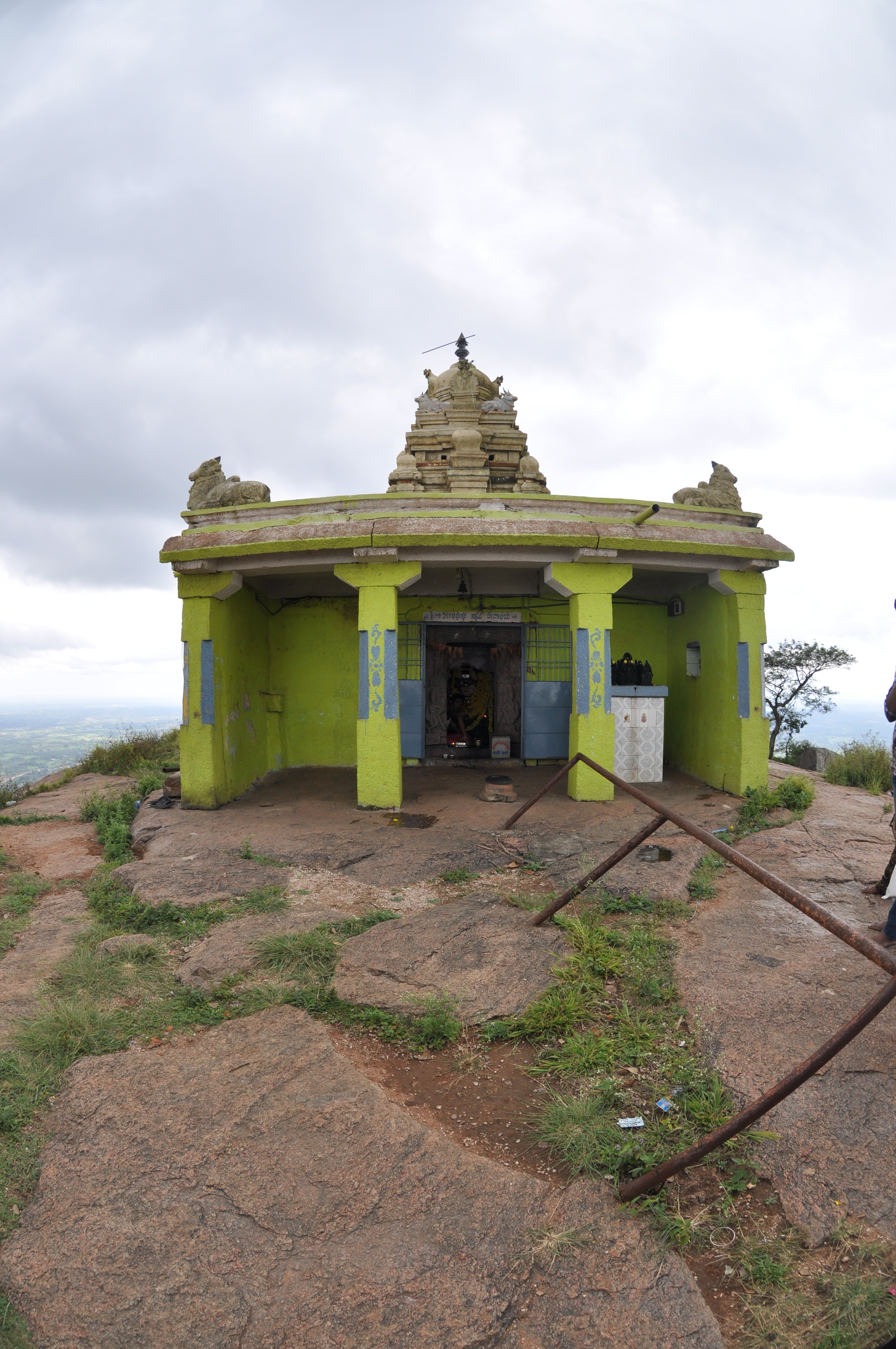
A temple on top

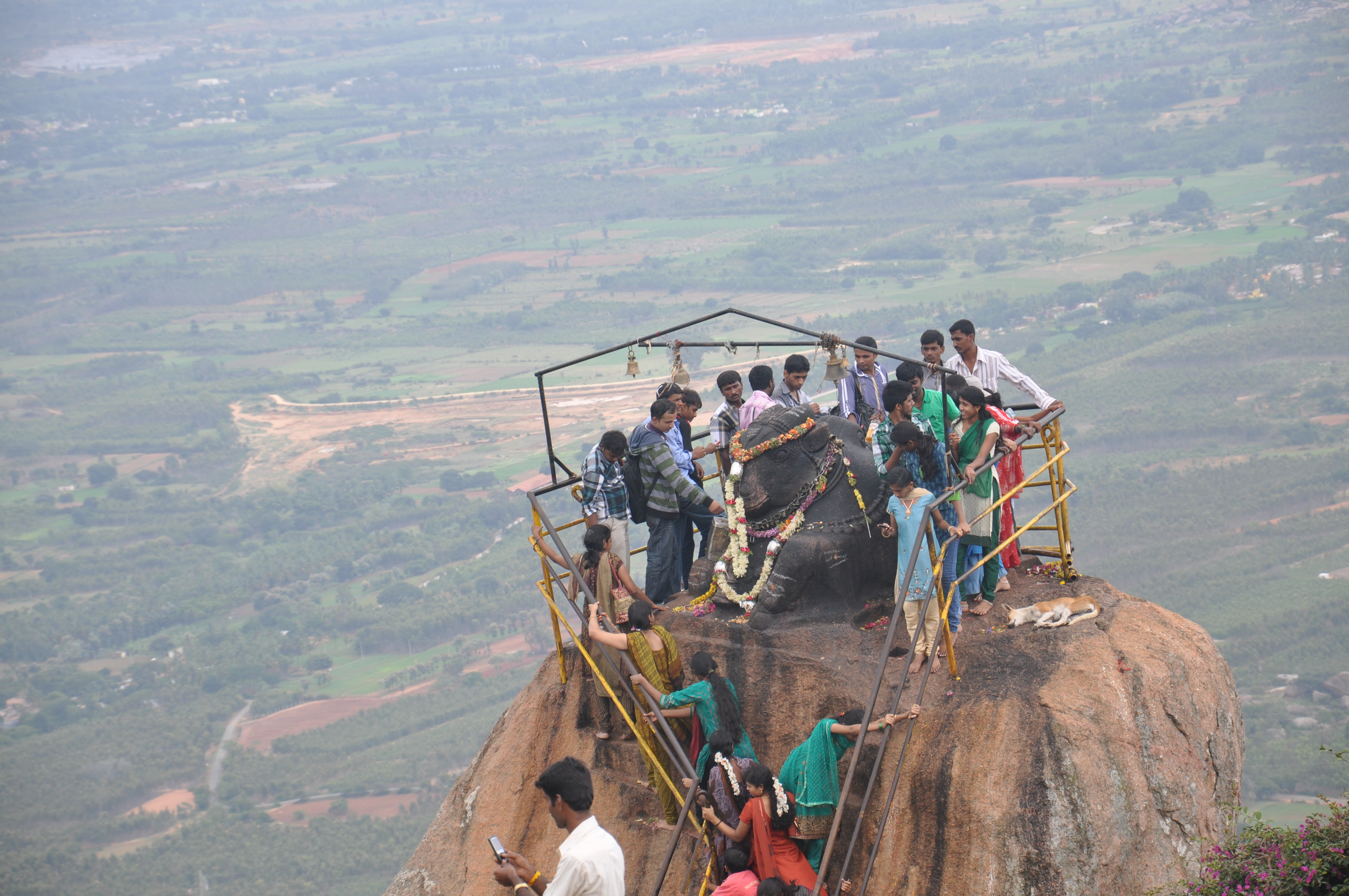
Basavanna

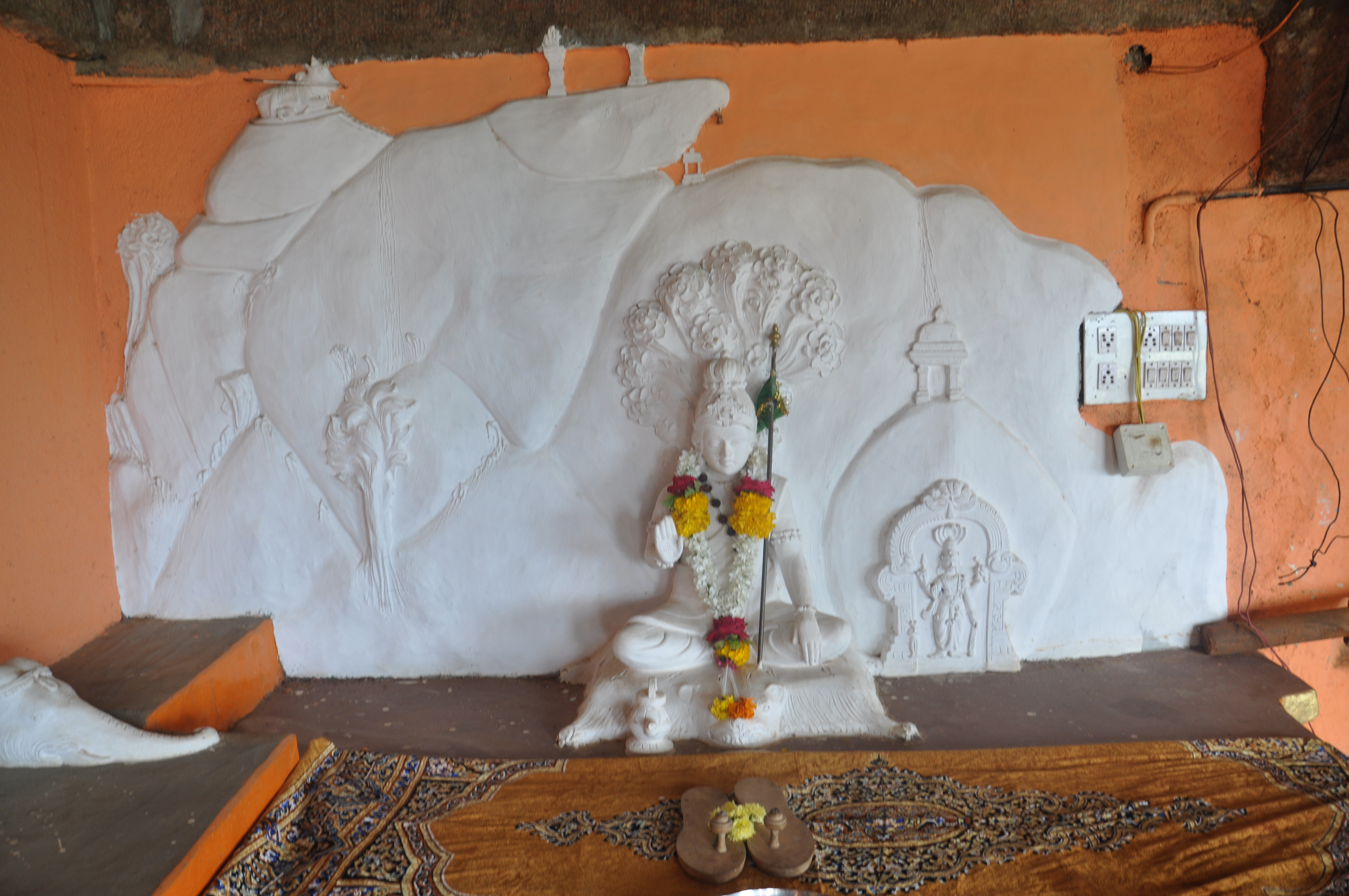
Olakal Theertha

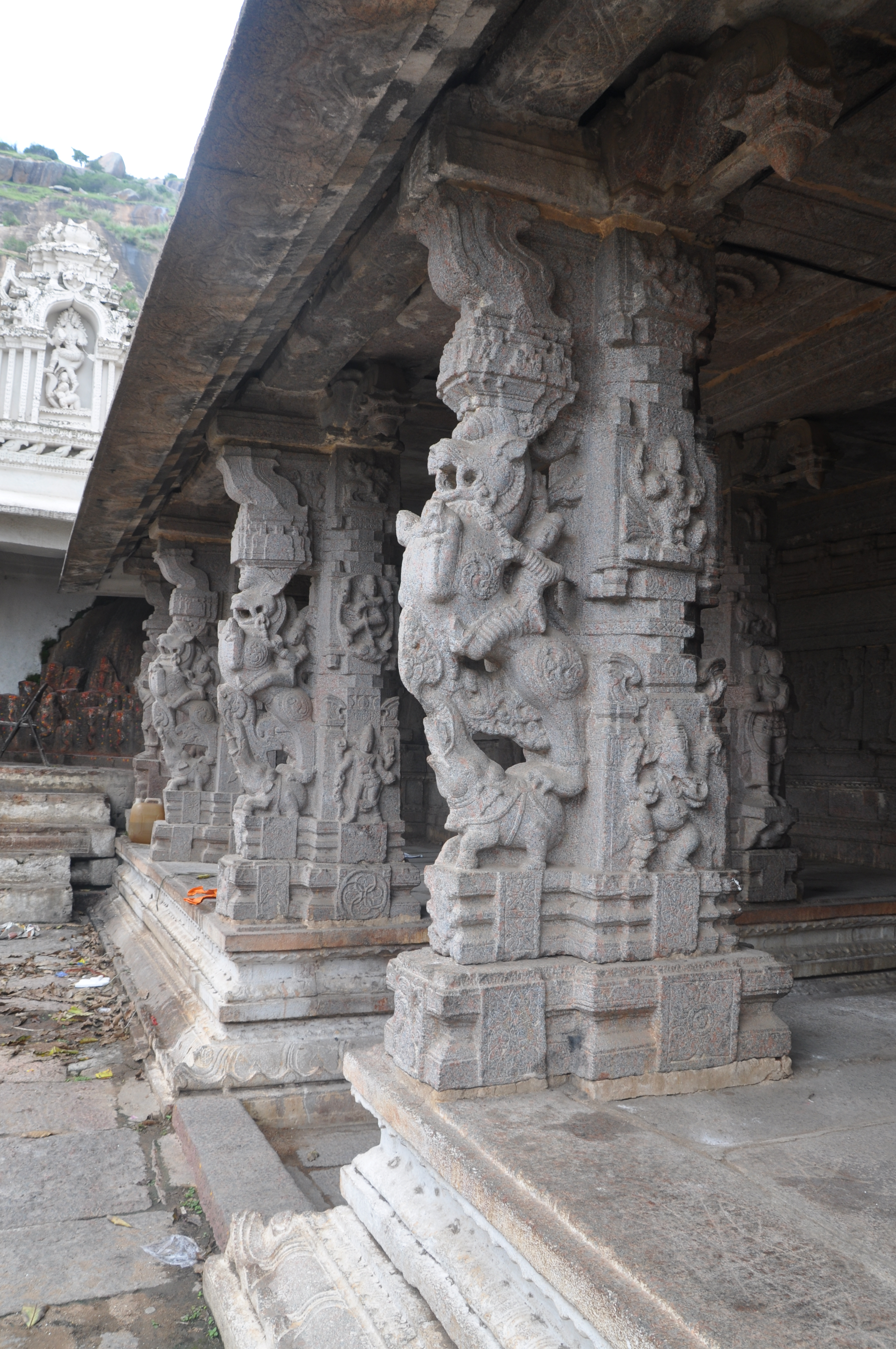
Architecture

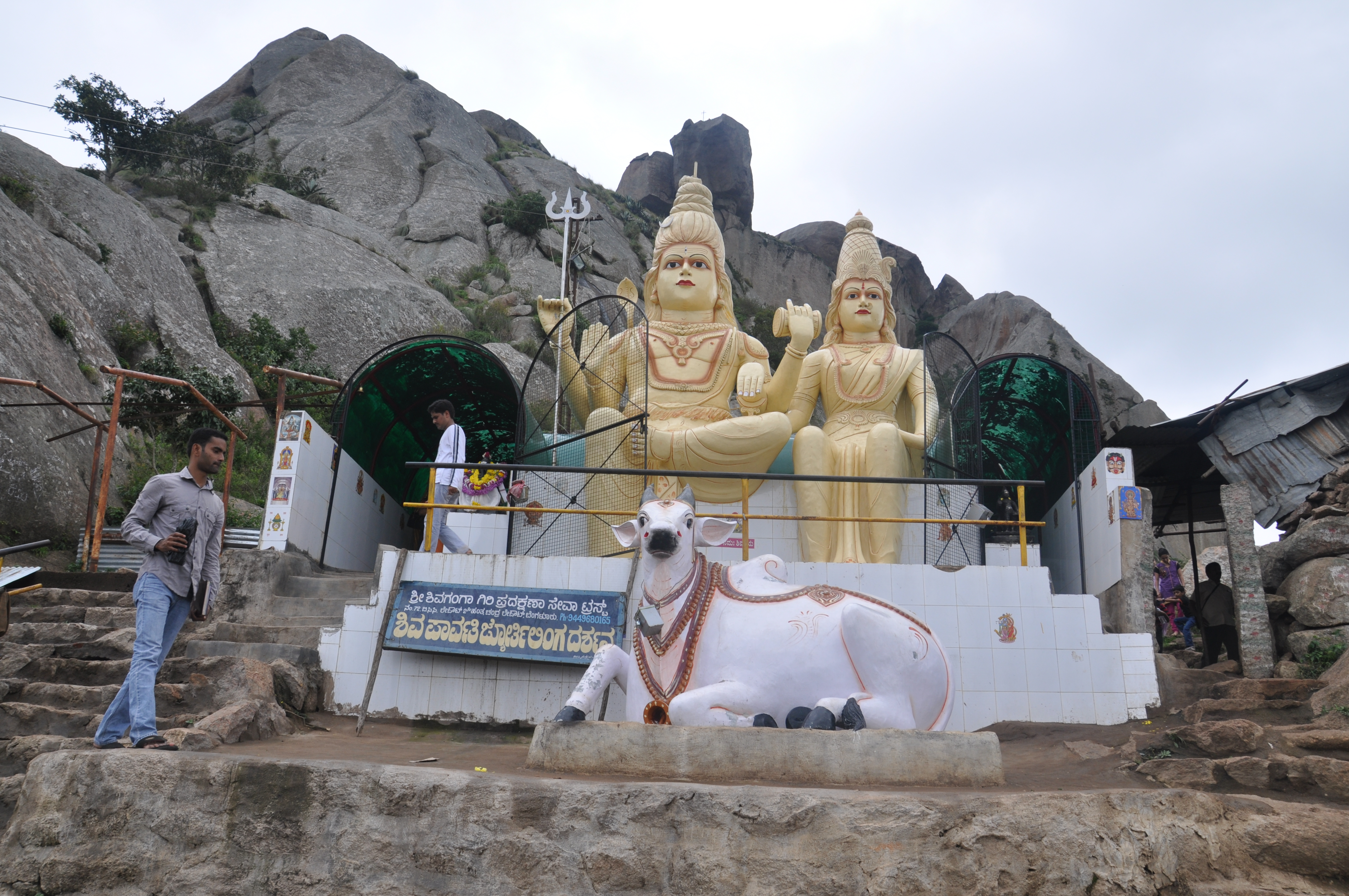
Shiva Parvathi

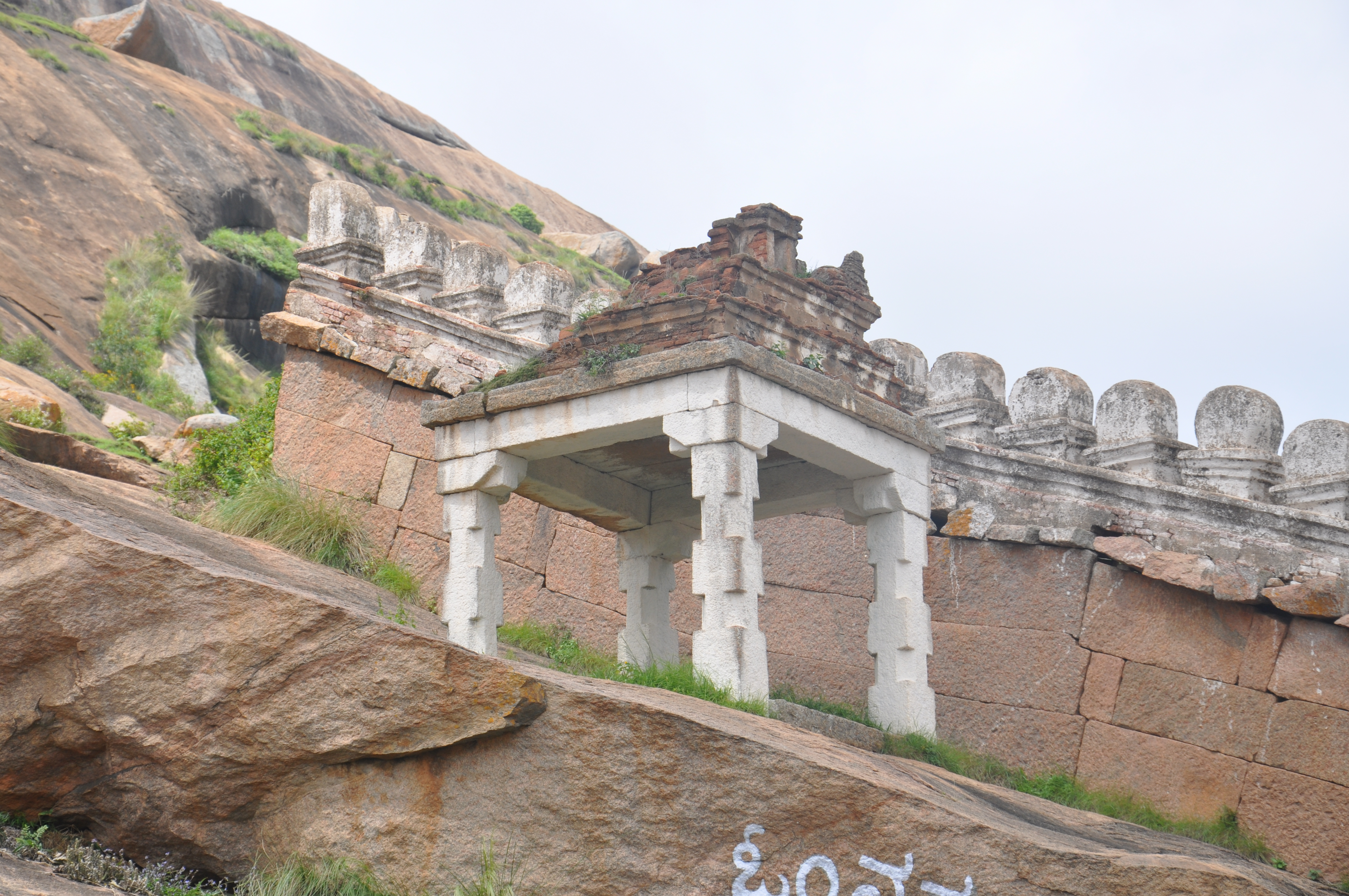
Architecture

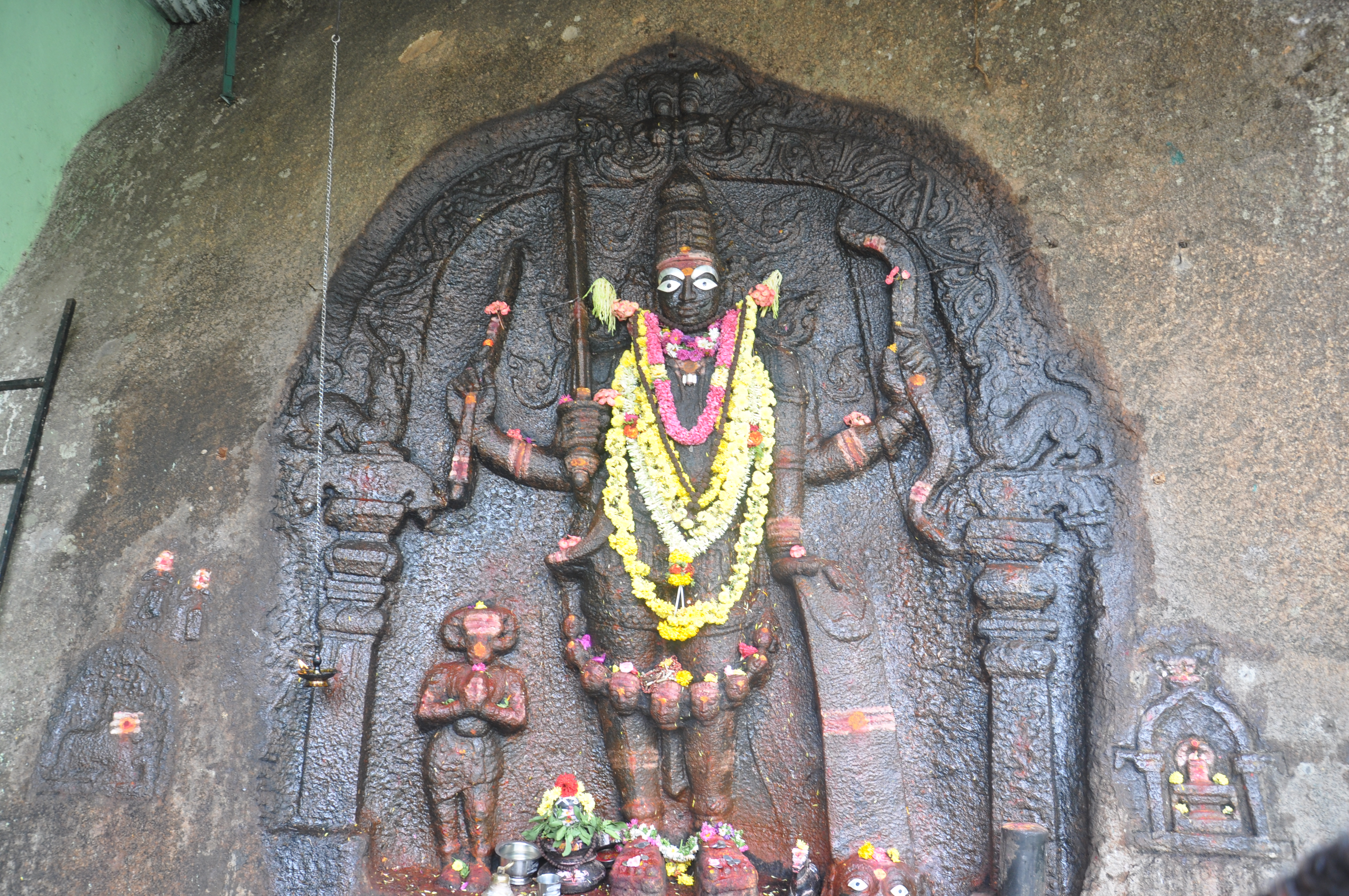
Veerabhadra Swamy

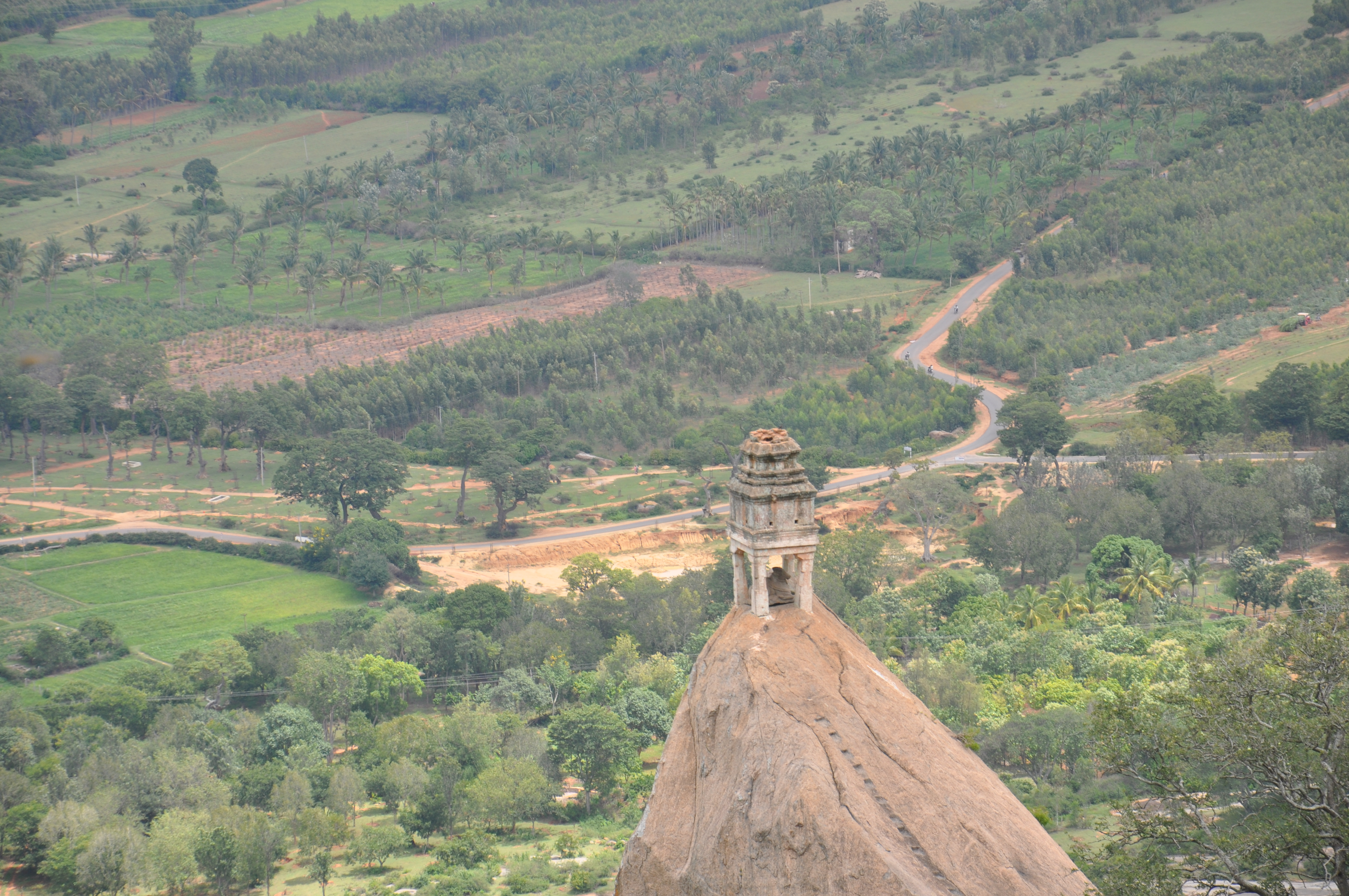
Basavanna

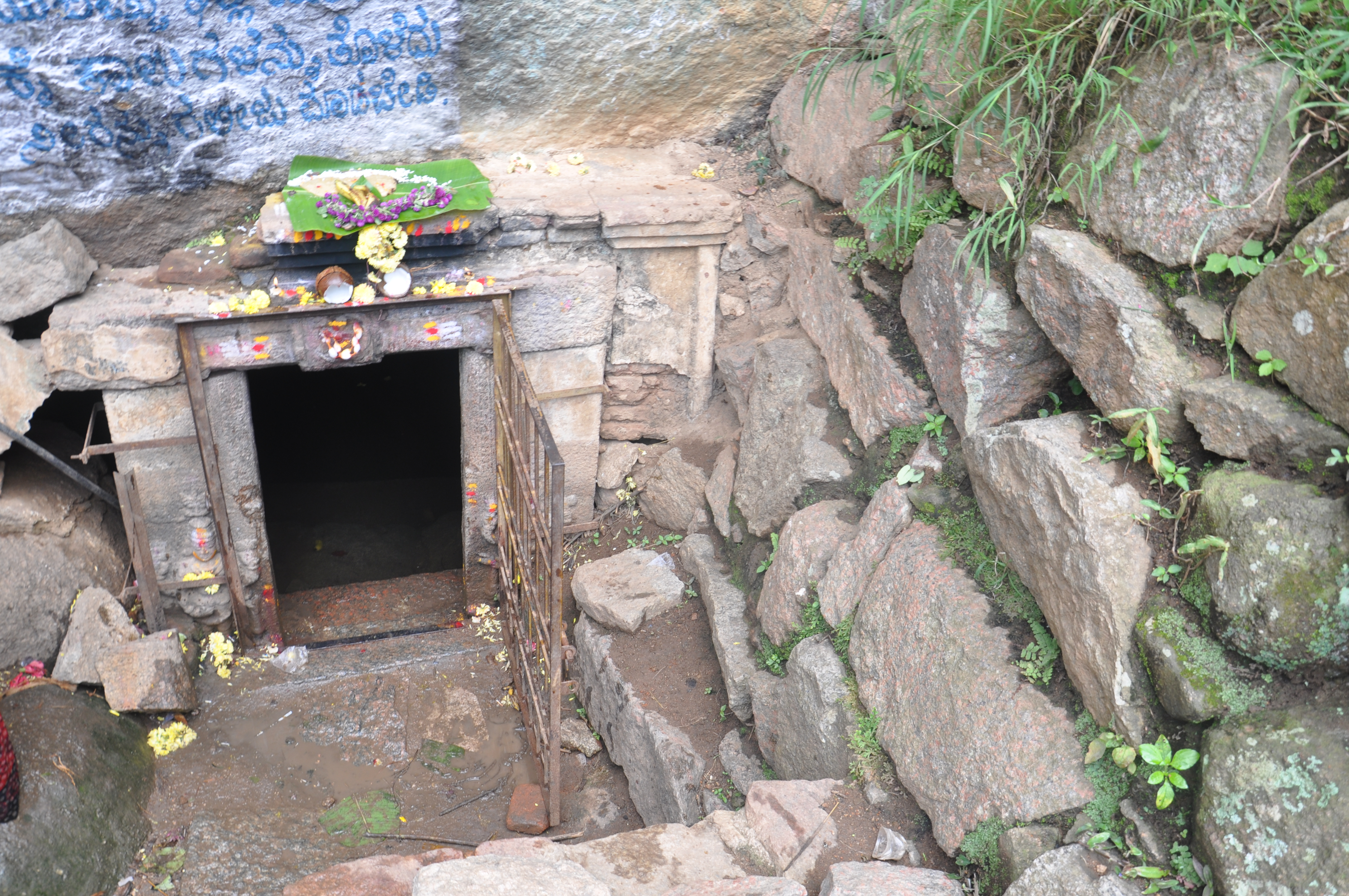
Olakal Theertha
