= Ranganathaswamy Temple, Bengaluru =

Coordinates: 12°58′12.94″N 77°34′45.57″E

Ranganathaswamy Temple

Religion
- Affiliation: Hinduism
- District: Bangalore
- Deity: Lord Ranganathaswamy

Location
- Location: Bangalore
- State: Karnataka
- Country: India
- Interactive map of Ranganathaswamy Temple

Architecture
- Type: Vijayanagara architecture
- Completed: 16th century

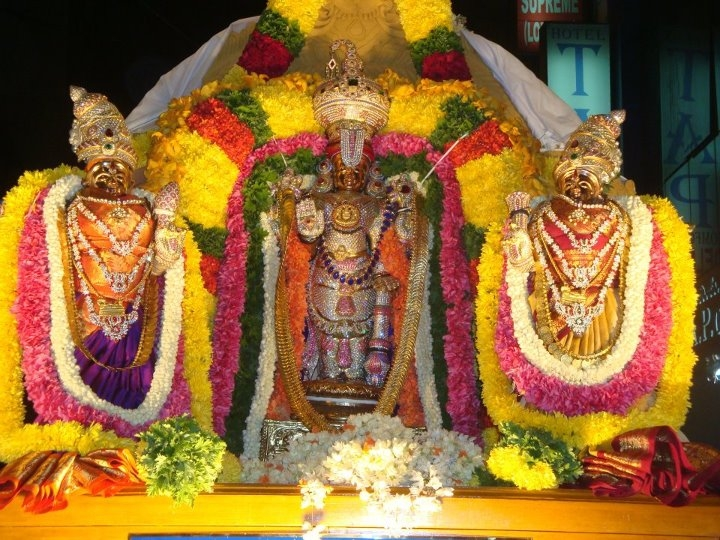
The Utsava Murthy of God Ranganathaswamy

Ranganathaswamy Temple, in Chikkapete, is an ancient and famous Hindu Vaikhanasa temple in Bangalore, Karnataka, India, dating back to the 16th century C.E dedicated to Lord Ranganathaswamy. The temple is built in the Vijayanagara style of architecture and has beautifully carved granite pillars reminiscent of Hoysala influence.

== Deities ==
The sanctum sanctorum which houses idols of Sri Ranganatha Swamy, and his consorts Sri Bhudevi and Neela Devi. The temple is located in the Chikkapete (Chickpet) area of central Bangalore on Rangaswamy Temple Street. The road is named after the Sri Ranganatha Swamy Temple.

== Festivals ==
Rathotsavam: The temple's Chariot Festival(Rathotsavam) takes place on Chaitra Shuddha Pournami every year and thousands of people come to see the Chariot Festival. The famous Bangalore Karaga Festival also happens to be on the same day.

Vaikuntha Ekadasi Uttara dwaara DarSanam also attracts thousands of people to this temple every year. Only On this auspicious day, people are allowed to perform a PradakshiNaa within the inner Praakaara surrounding the main temple. Numerous volunteers throng to this temple on this day to manage the crowd and help the temple management in maintaining the crowds and facilitating darshan of Moolavar and Utsavar murthis of Sri Ranganatha Swamy.
