= Hebbur =

Town in Karnataka, India

Hebburu ghanapuri
- Town
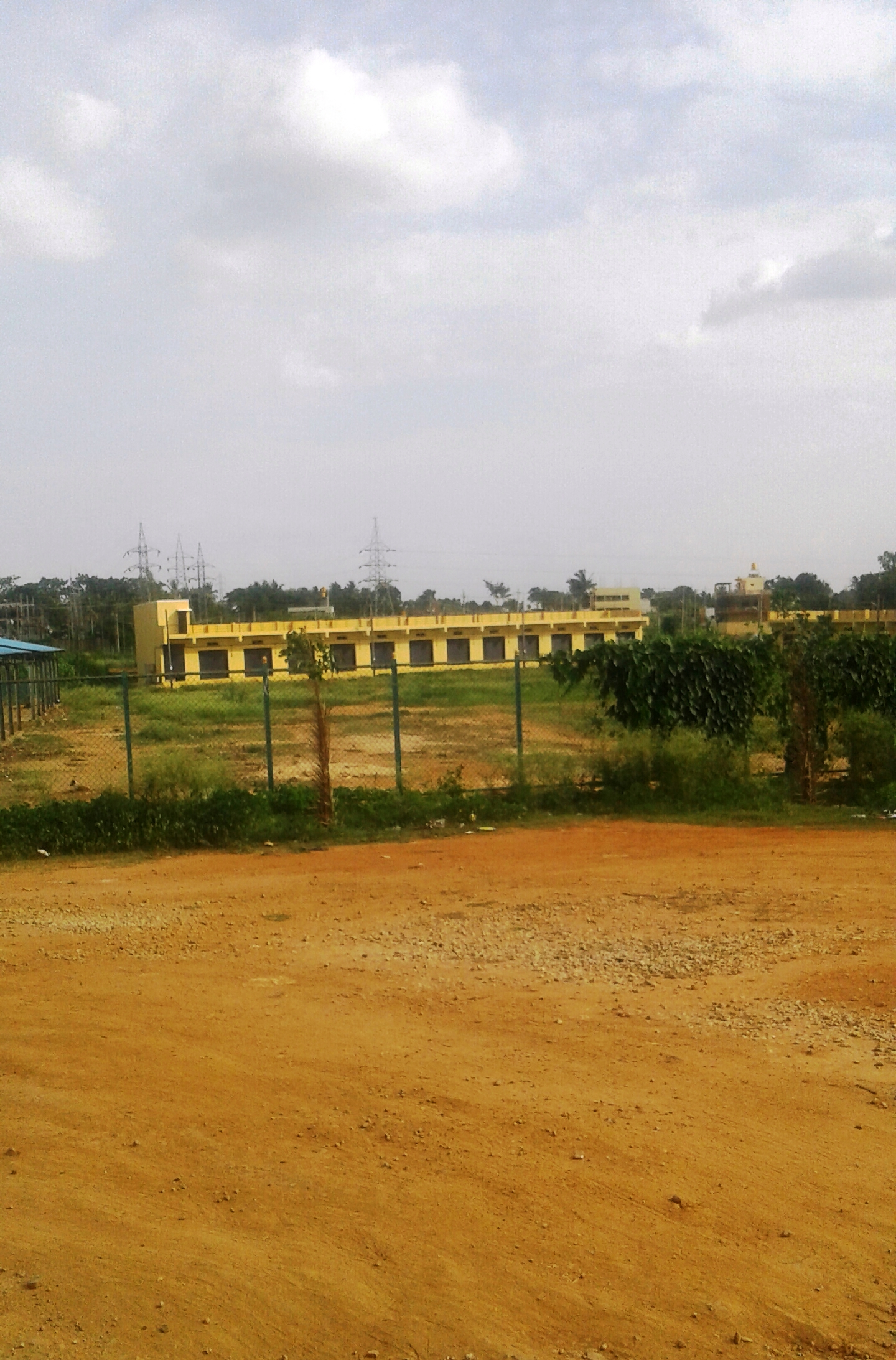
- Hebburu
- Interactive map of Hebburu ghanapuri
- Coordinates: 13°09′N 77°02′E
- Country: India
- State: Karnataka
- District: Tumkur
- Talukas: Tumkur

Population (2024)
  - Total: 15,350

Languages
  - Official: Kannada
- Time zone: UTC+5:30 (IST)

Hebburu is a Town in the southern state of Karnataka, India. It is located in the Tumkur taluk of Tumkur district in Karnataka.

The Sri Kamakshi Sharada Mutt, whose presiding deity is the goddess Kamakshi Sharada, is in the town. A very rare piece of Hindu iconography, called the 'Shri Chakra' made of panchaloha, an alloy of five metals, is installed in the shrine. It is supposed to represent the Primeval Energy from which the whole universe issues forth, and is held very auspicious by many Hindus. This icon is believed to have been found in a deep well in this tiny town.

This town has the Shri Veeranjaneya Swamy temple at Kote area. The Shri Hanumantha Devaru Statue is big and is believed to be installed by Shri Vyasaraja Theertha Swamy, some 500 years ago during the period of the great Vijayanagara emperor Shri Krishnadevaraya.

This town has the Shri Veerabhadra Swamy Temple at the entrance of the village where people worship with Lord Veerabhadra Swamy. Every Year they conduct Jathra Mahotsava at time of Summer Holidays which means between April and June also you can find very old chariot which has been made up of Stone Wheel and the statue of Brahma Rakshasa which is also very older the 200Years ago.

There are 101 Temple and 101 Kalyani which has been constructed during the rule of Krishnadevaraya of the Vijayanagara dynasty. All the temples and kalyanis were destroyed at the time of British rule. The old sculptures in Hebburu are yet to be discovered.

This town was earlier called as 'Ghanapuri', which is a Sanskrit translation of its Kannada name, Hebburu. The town had more than 100 temples, most of which are in bad shape now.

== Demographics ==
At the 2024 India census Hebbur had a population of 15350 (7900 males,7530 females).

== Image gallery ==
Directions:

The Hebbur is located between Kunigal and Tumkur. So you can reach via Tumkur (NH 4) or Kunigal (NH 48). The Kunigal route is bit shorter.

If you travel via Kunigal, then you need to get-off the highway after the Kunigal KIADB to go through an underpass to get on to the road to Kunigal town. Within Kunigal town at the first three road junction (or circle) take the right turn to reach Hebbur. In Hebbur, pass the town to take U turn and then left turn to reach the temple.

If you travel via Tumkur then you need to get-off the highway after the Tumkur toll-plaza, to get on to Tumkur Ring Road before Kyathasandra. When you are on the Tumkur Ring Road take left turn at the junction of Kunigal Road near Maralur to reach Hebbur. In Hebbur, take the left turn to reach the temple.

== See also ==
- Tumkur
- Districts of Karnataka
