= Surupa Sen =

Indian Odissi dancer

- Born: 22 November 1969 (age 56); Bareilly, Uttar Pradesh, India
- Occupations: Odissi dancer, choreographer, artistic director
- Known for: Artistic Director of Nrityagram, contributions to Odissi
- Awards: Sangeet Natak Akademi Award (2018); Raza Foundation Award (2006); Yagnaraman Award (2008); Nritya Choodamani (2011)

Surupa Sen (born 22 November 1969) is an Indian Odissi dancer, choreographer, and artistic director of Nrityagram, a dance ensemble and training institute based in Hessaraghatta, Karnataka. She is recognized for her innovative choreography and leadership in promoting Odissi globally, contributing significantly to Indian classical dance. She has received the Sangeet Natak Akademi Award (2018), Raza Foundation Award (2006, 2017), Yagnaraman Award (2008), and Nritya Choodamani title from Sri Krishna Gana Sabha, Chennai (2011) for her contributions to Odissi.

== Early life ==
Sen was born on 22 November 1969 in Bareilly, Uttar Pradesh, India. She began training in Odissi at age five under gurus including Kelucharan Mohapatra, Protima Gauri, Bichitranandan Swain, and Ratikant Mohapatra. She also studied Abhinaya under Kalanidhi Narayanan and Natyashastra under Padma Subrahmanyam. Additionally, she trained in Bharatanatyam, which informed her approach to Odissi.

== Career ==
Sen joined Nrityagram in 1990, soon after its founding by Protima Gauri, and later became its artistic director. She has choreographed productions such as Sri: In Search of the Goddess (2000), Ansh (2006), Sacred Space (2006), and Ahuti (2018), blending traditional Odissi techniques with contemporary themes. Her choreography, often performed with Bijayini Satpathy, emphasizes Odissi’s lyrical and expressive qualities.

Under Sen’s direction, Nrityagram has performed at international venues, including the Joyce Theater, Jacob’s Pillow Dance Festival, Edinburgh International Festival, and Skirball Center in New York, earning recognition for precision and emotional depth. She has performed in the U.S., U.K., Australia, Sri Lanka, and countries in the Far East. Her work at festivals like Dancing the Gods has showcased Odissi’s spiritual and aesthetic qualities. Sen has collaborated with groups like Sri Lanka’s Chitrasena Dance Company for cross-cultural productions. Her leadership has fostered a community dedicated to Indian classical dance at Nrityagram.

== Awards and recognition ==
Surupa Sen received the Sangeet Natak Akademi Award in 2018 for her contributions to Odissi. She was also honored with the Raza Foundation Award for Excellence (2006) and Raza Foundation Award (2017), Yagnaraman Award (2008), and Nritya Choodamani title by Sri Krishna Gana Sabha, Chennai (2011). Her performances have been recognized at events like the Annual Music and Dance Fest in Chennai.
