= Vasanta Habba =

Cultural festival in Bangalore, India

Vasanta Habba (Kannada: ವಸಂತ ಹಬ್ಬ), which means spring festival in the Kannada language, is a cultural festival organised by the Nrityagram foundation in the city of Bangalore, India. It is a very popular event and is considered the classical Woodstock of India. This festival, first held in the year 1990, was the brainchild of Protima Bedi, the founder of Nrityagram. The festival is held in the premises of Nrityagram at Hesaraghatta in the outskirts of Bangalore and attracts the best musicians, dancers and cultural artists from across India. Starting from an audience of about 3000 in its inaugural year, the 2003 edition saw over 40,000 people attending the event.

== Festival ==
The festival is one-night festival which starts in the late evening and goes on till the early morning of the next day. It is held in the amphitheatre located in the premises of Nrityagram at Hesaragahatta, which is a small village located 35 kilometres from the city of Bangalore. There is no entry fee and the seats are available on a first-come basis. Due to this fact, the seats start filling up from the afternoon itself. The publicity for the festival is held in a unique manner by employing folk artists and other troupes who perform on the roads of Bangalore, which publicise the event and also act as a curtain-raiser for the festival. The event is organised with the help of volunteers who belong to the colleges in the city. Many like-minded people also contribute to the event by sponsoring food stalls at the venue, organising food for the artists and also providing cars and other automobiles for ferrying musicians and artists to the venue. The amphitheatre can accommodate about 3,000 people and large screens are provided outside the venue for people who could not get a seat in time.

== Chronology ==
=== 2002 ===
Held on 2 Feb 2002, the artists who performed included Aruna Sairam (Carnatic vocal), the Warsi brothers, Ateeq Hussain Khan (Qawwali) and Suma Sudhindra (who introduced the Tarangini veena). This event was beamed live on Doordarshan and also received good coverage on other TV channels

=== 2003 ===
Performances in this edition of Vasanta Habba included a concert on the Mohan Veena by Grammy Award winner, Pandit Vishwa Mohan Bhatt, Hindustani classical by Shubha Mudgal, fusion music by Taufiq Querishi and qawwali by the Ateeq Hussain Khan Warsi brothers. This event was attended by over 40,000 people.

=== 2004 ===
Held on 7 Feb 2004, the artists who performed included the renowned saxophonist Kadri Gopalnath and the Carnatic music exponent, Bombay Jayashri.

== Current Scenario ==
The event was not held in the year 2005 because India was facing the after-effects of the Indian Ocean tsunami. Habba was never held again and Nrityagram blamed it on a financial crisis. Since Nrityagram has not commented on the fate of Habba, it is assumed that the festival has been scrapped for good. Meanwhile, their dance ensemble has consistently received rave reviews and now go on frequent annual performance tours to the US and other countries.
