= Hesaraghatta Lake =

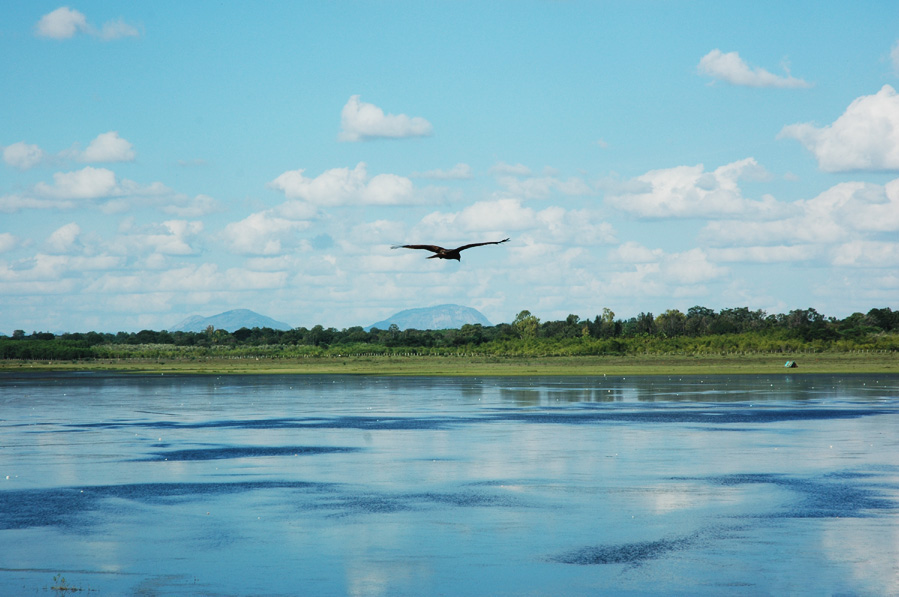
- View of Lake in 2006

- Location within Karnataka
- Location: Bengaluru Urban, Karnataka
- Coordinates: 13.15°N 77.49°E
- Type: Freshwater lake
- Primary inflows: Arkavathy River
- Catchment area: 73.83 km^{2} (28.51 sq mi)
- Basin countries: India
- Surface area: 4.50 km^{2} (1,110 acres)
- Max. depth: 27.44 m (90.0 ft)
- Water volume: 28,240,000 m^{3} (997,000,000 ft^{3})
- Surface elevation: 861 m (2,825 ft)
- Settlements: Bengaluru, KA-52

Hesaraghatta Lake is a humanmade reservoir located 18 km to the north-west of Bengaluru in Karnataka state, India. It is a fresh water lake created in the year 1894 across the Arkavathy River to meet the drinking water needs of the city. Sir K. Seshadri Iyer, the then Dewan of erstwhile Mysore state and the then Chief Engineer of Mysuru, M. C. Hutchins, planned to build the scheme called the "Chamarajendra Water Works" to store a three-years' water supply to the city.

This crucial water body is an integral part of the recently declared Hesaraghatta Grasslands Conservation Reserve, enhancing its ecological and biodiversity significance.

== Access ==
The lake is approachable by road from Bengaluru at a distance of 26.5 km to the north-west of the city.

== Topography ==
The total catchment area draining into the Lake at the dam built on the River Arkavati is 73.84 km^{2} (2189 mi^{2}), out of which the direct draining catchment is 2.68 km^{2} (6.86 sq mi^{2}). There are 184 tanks built in the Arkavati river basin upstream of the Hesaraghatta lake. The River Arkavati originates in the Nandi Hills of Chikkaballapur district and joins the River Kaveri at Kanakapura after flowing through Kolar District and Bangalore Rural district. The Vrishabhavati and the Suvarnamukhi are the tributaries which drain part of Bengaluru and Anekal Taluk respectively into the Arkavati River. The catchment receives a mean annual rainfall of 859.6 mm.

== Hydrology and water works ==
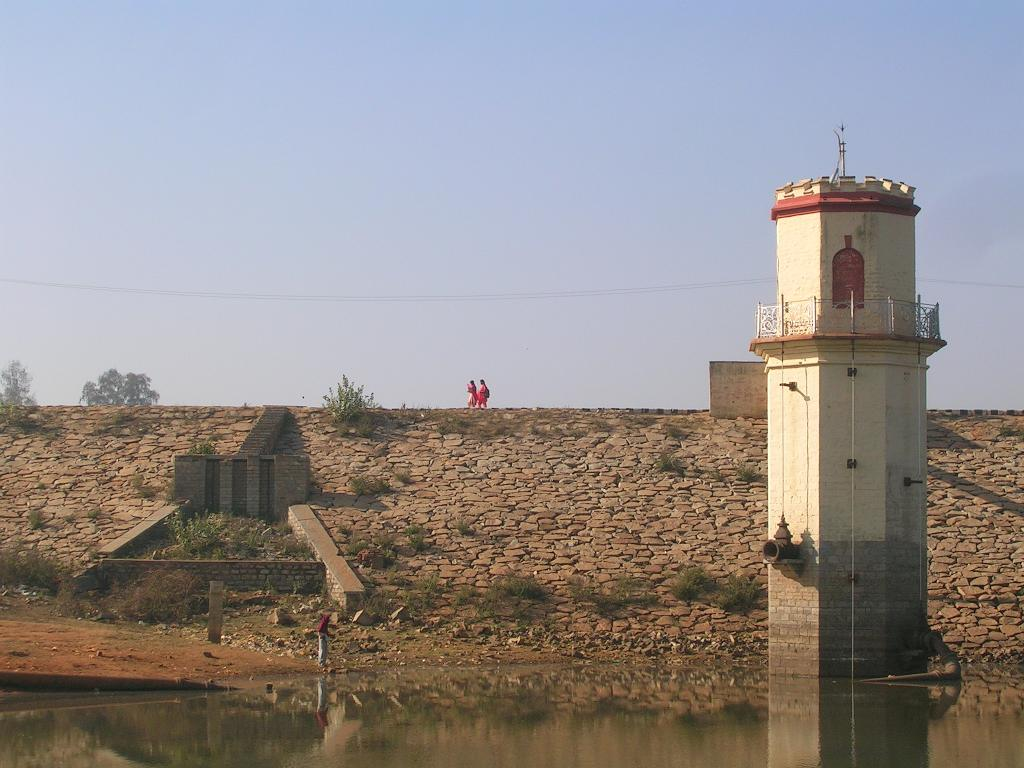
Pumphouse

The Arkavathy River is one of the two rivers which partially meet the water supply needs of Bangalore; the other being the Kaveri. The reservoirs created by building dams on the Arkavathy are the "Hesaraghatta" and the "Chamarajasagara" at Thippagondanahalli (TG Halli) built during the years 1894 and 1933 respectively. The Hesaraghatta dam is an earthen bund of 1,690 m (5,540 ft) with a total height of 40.55 m (133.0 ft) creating the Hesaraghatta Lake (reservoir) with storage of 997 M.Cft at full reservoir level with a lake surface area of 450 hectares (1,100 acres). Water from the reservoir is taken through initially a 1.4 m dia (42" dia) Hume pipe to the Soladevanahalli Pumping Station by gravity and then pumped (using steam pumps initially and later changed to electric pumps at Soladevanahalli) against a head of 115 to 135 m to the Combined Jewel Filters (CJF) plant at Malleswaram for treatment and supply to the consumers in the city.

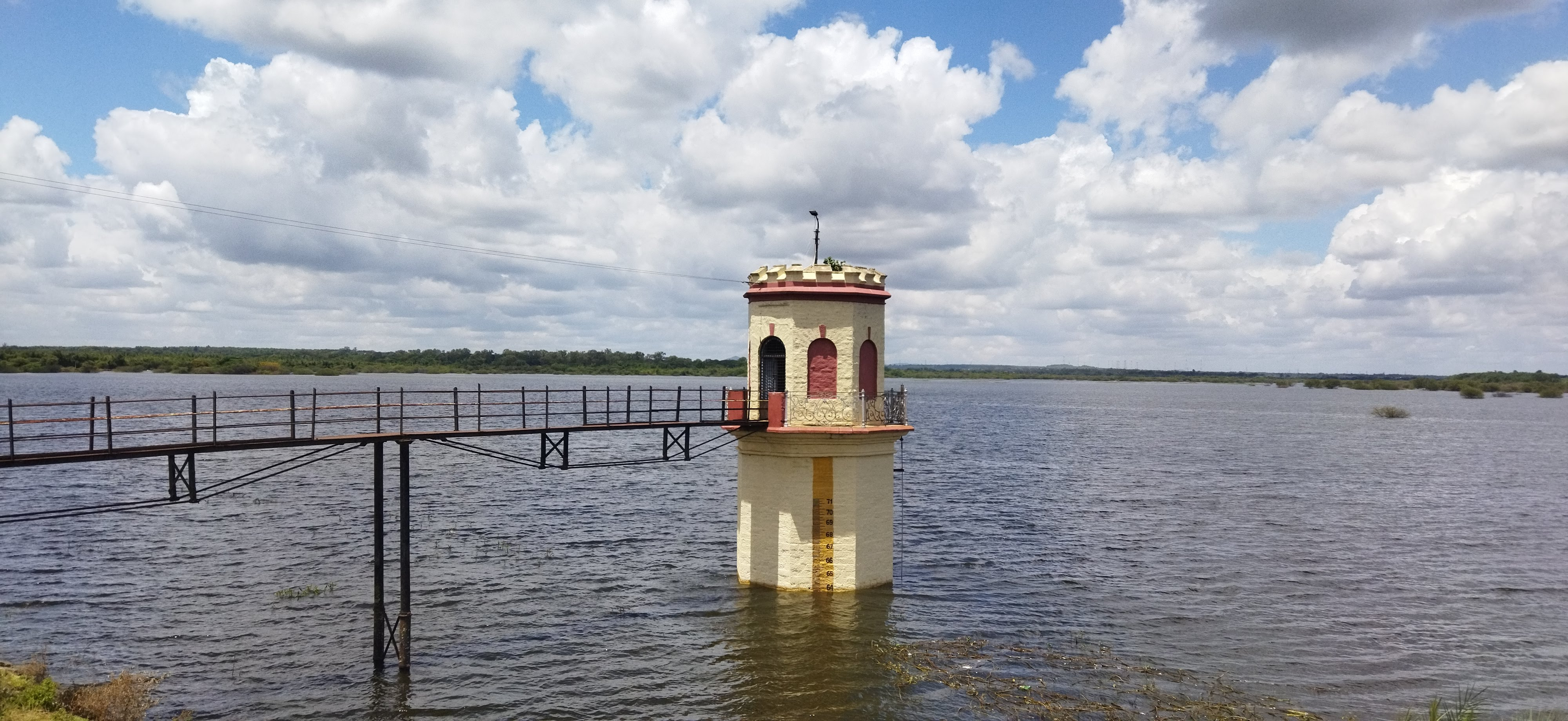
Hesarghatta Lake Pump House

When the Hesaraghatta Lake started drying up in the year 1925, as an urgent remedial measure, another dam was built to create a reservoir called the Chamaraja Sagar at TG Halli, downstream of the Hesaraghatta Lake. This dam has been enlarged from time to time, over the years, to meet partially, the increasing water supply demand of Bengaluru.

== Deterioration of the lake ==
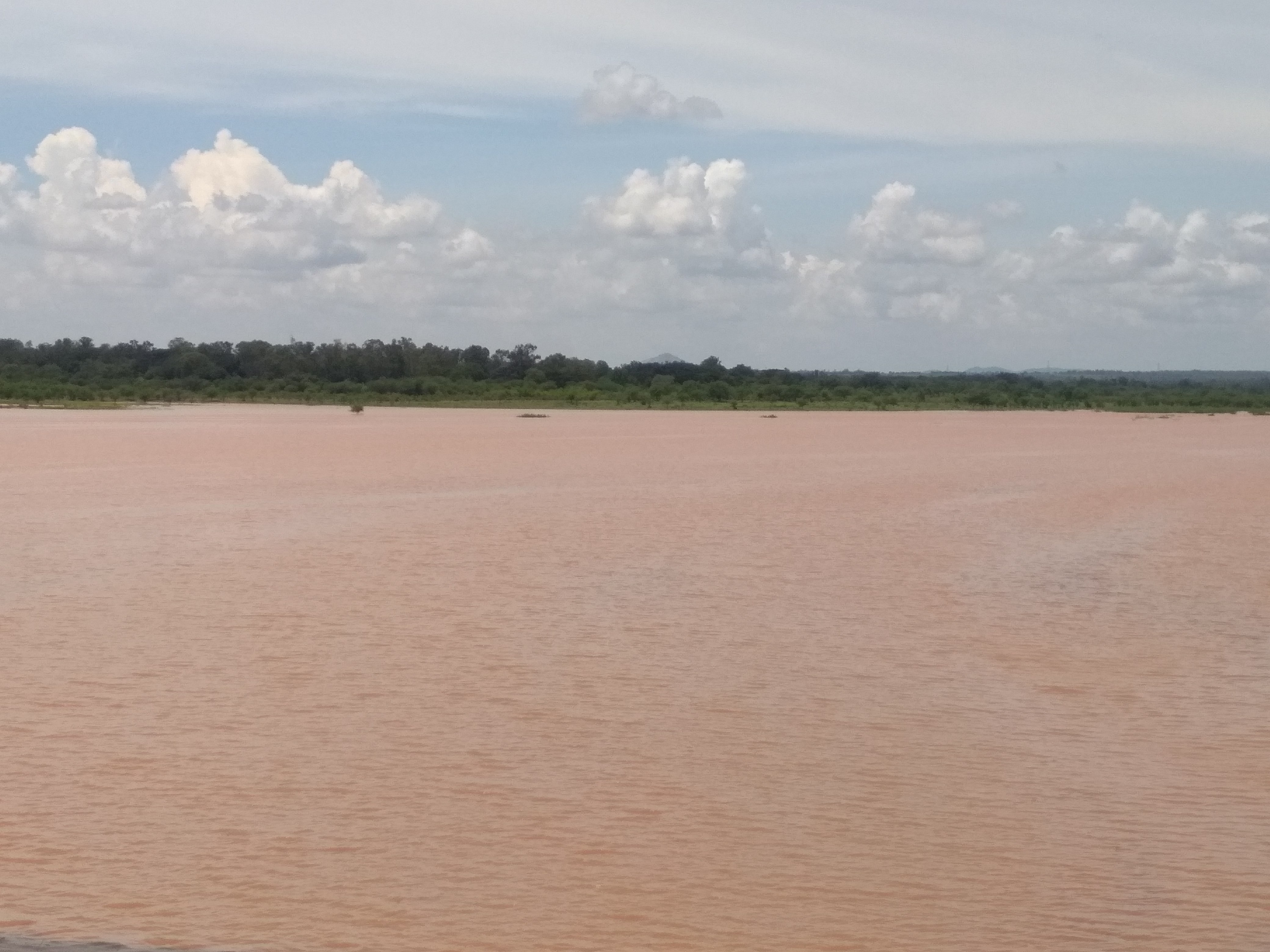
Hesaraghatta Lake (7 Sept 2017)

The reservoir is reported to have filled up last in the year 1994 and thereafter the lake's deterioration and drying up started, reducing its reliability as a water supply source.

The reasons attributed to the lake's drying up are erosion in the catchment and consequent capacity shrinking due to continuous silting. As of January 2020, the lake is completely dry. In 2022, after a gap of 23 years the lake was filled once again to its brim due to heavy rainfall in the surrounding areas and Arkavati catchment area.

In recent years, the Hesaraghatta Lake bed has seen an increased number of bird photographers who drive on the lake bed using their cars and SUVs as hides resulting in extensive damage to the grassland habitat. This has increased the vehicle tracks to 43 km in total, with the average track width coming to 1.62 meters. About 136 hectares of habitat was either lost or disturbed because of vehicular movement. Some of the practices by villagers such as open defecation are also common.

Main factors affecting degradation include sand mining, movement of tractors, tree plantations, and grazing of cattle.

== Avifauna ==
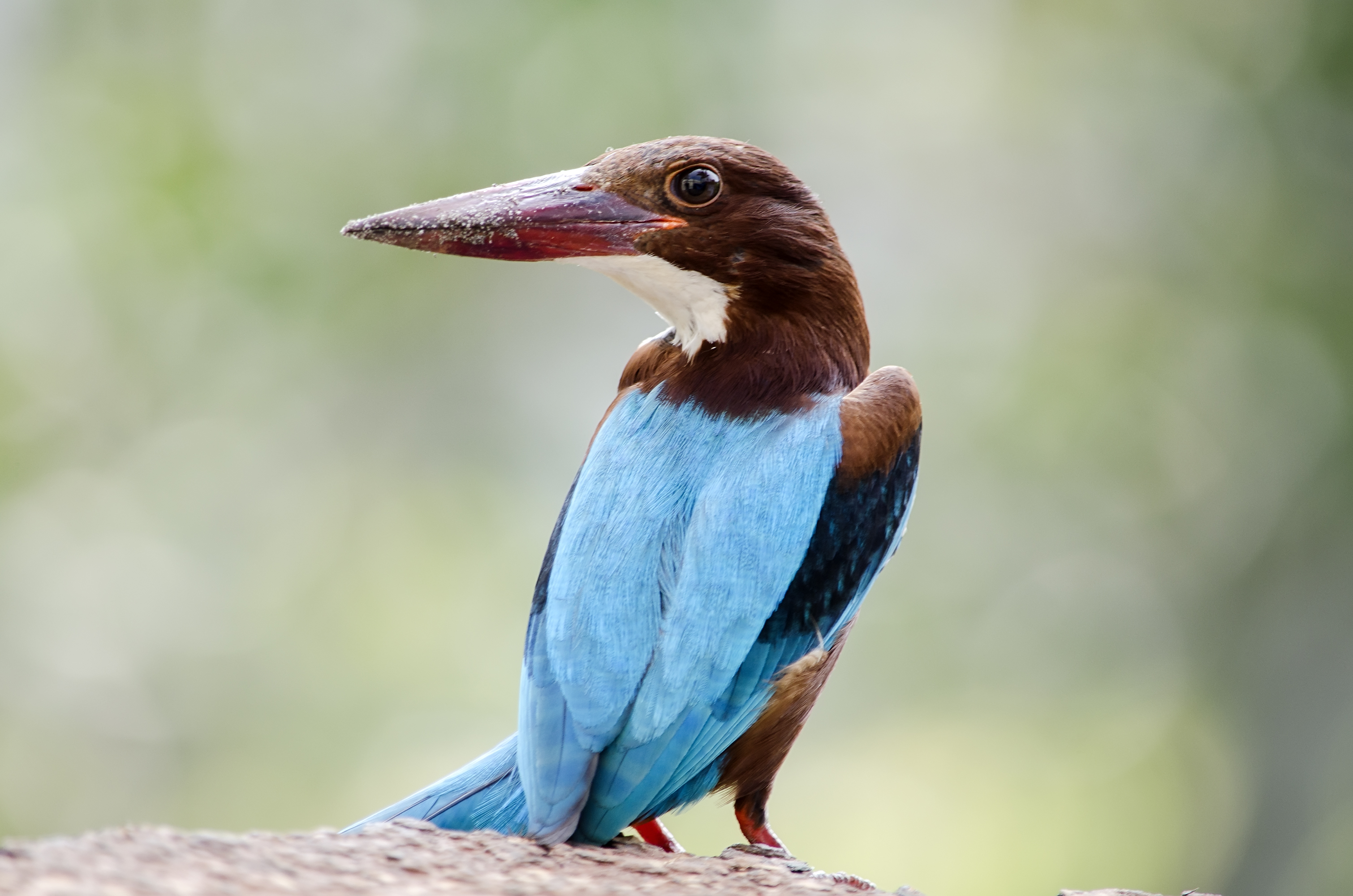
White-throated Kingfisher in the Lake area

Even in the deteriorated condition of the lake, birds such as the White-breasted Kingfisher (Halcyon smyrnensis), Magpie Robin (Copsychus saularis), Little Egrets, Common Mynas (Acridotheres tristis), Brahminy Kites, Black Drongos, Bulbuls, greater coucals, purple sunbirds, etc., (some are pictured in the gallery) have been reported in and around the lake periphery. Documented records of sighting of 2000 water birds of 29 species have been reported. The lake is also a great place for the winter migrants. Harriers and spotted eagles have been reported on this lake during winter. Bird poaching traps, a common sight, are located and removed from the bed of the lake quite often. In summers, Junonia almana is common. The lake is dried and grass grows on it, on which Vanessa cardui can be found. Colotis amata, Colotis danae, Colotis aurora, and Cepora nerissa are common on Cadaba fruticosa. The lake area is hotter than the rest of Bangalore usually by 1 degrees Celsius. It is the only breeding spot off the Lilac silverline, Aphnaeus lilacinus in South India.

== Call for restoration ==
Apart from the water supply, the lake, which was known for its birds and river rafting (wind surfing), has drawn the attention of public spirited organisations and individuals for undertaking restoration works to revive it.

- The Madras Engineer Group (MEG) of the Indian Army in association with local community organizations such as the "Arkavathy Kere Ulisi Andolana Samithi (AKASH)", which literally means "Save Arkavati Lake Movement" of Hesaraghatta and "Friends of Hesaraghatta Lake" undertook 'shramadana' (voluntary manual labour), in May 2004, to clear the main inlet to the lake. It is reported that this activity enabled increase of water storage in the lake which was stated to be 1.22–1.83 m (4.0–6.0 ft) of water in an area of about 66.7 hectares (165 acres). AKASH has now sought help of more volunteers to increase the depth of the lake to 3 m (9.8 ft) to attract several species of birds.

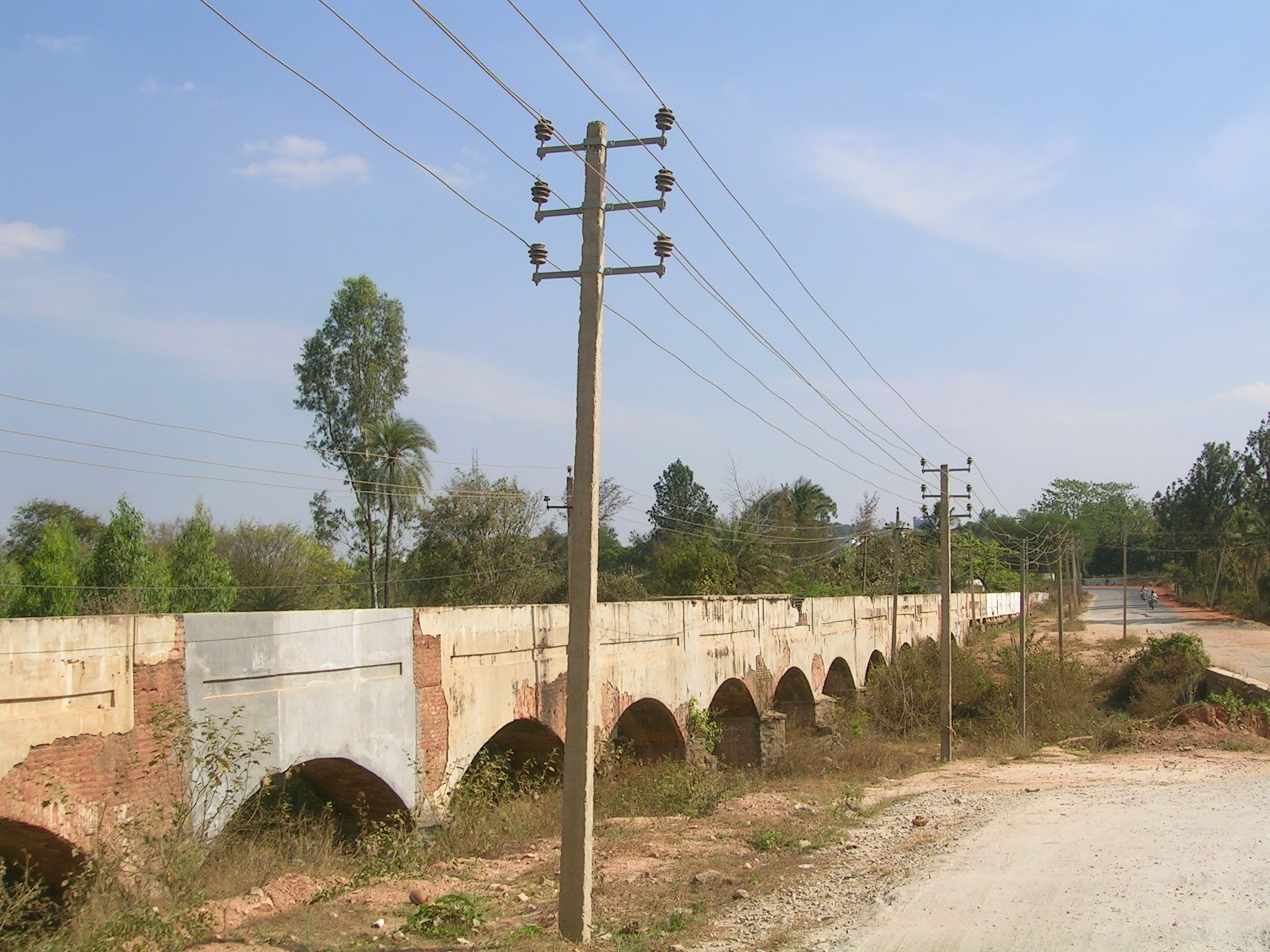
Old aqueduct

- The "OORU-NEERU" Water Walk was organised by the public spirited people of Bangalore to Hesaraghatta Lake to see and study the status of the Lake and evaluate the relationship of a city to its waters. The observation made by the study is that:
  It is more correct to refer to the Hesaraghatta reservoir as a 'once upon a time' water lifeline for Bengaluru rather than a current lifeline.

The walk has also brought out facts such as, a) presence of the reservoir and old pumps, b) the building of 1896 A.D. vintage which has maps displayed in a building depicting how the water was received and pumped, c) the water level chart of the Hesaraghatta reservoir till 2000 A.D, d)a rain gauge to measure the rainfall, e) the remnants of the brick aqueduct to convey water by gravity at Turbanahalli and f) the Siphon at the Hesaraghatta Lake used to discharge the flood waters when the reservoir was full. The final verdict of the Water Walkers is that:

The Hesaraghatta reservoir has the capacity to supplement Bengaluru water requirements at a far cheaper cost than any other. It makes ecological and economic sense to look at its revival.

- Another voluntary effort, the latest, is of the three member team of a villager, a photo journalist and an economist who found that the lake was being de-silted with bull dozers at the lake's eastern channel to connect it with the catchment area and which could bring water into the lake during the monsoon.

== Places of interest ==
The fertile area which encircles the Lake has a number of important institutions such as the Government Aquarium, Government Film and Television Institute, Indian Horticultural Research Institute, Indo-Danish Poultry and Dairy farms with its livestock breeding and poultry centres which face the Lake, and the famous Nrityagram, founded by Odissi dancer, the late Protima Gauri in 1990.

== Gallery ==
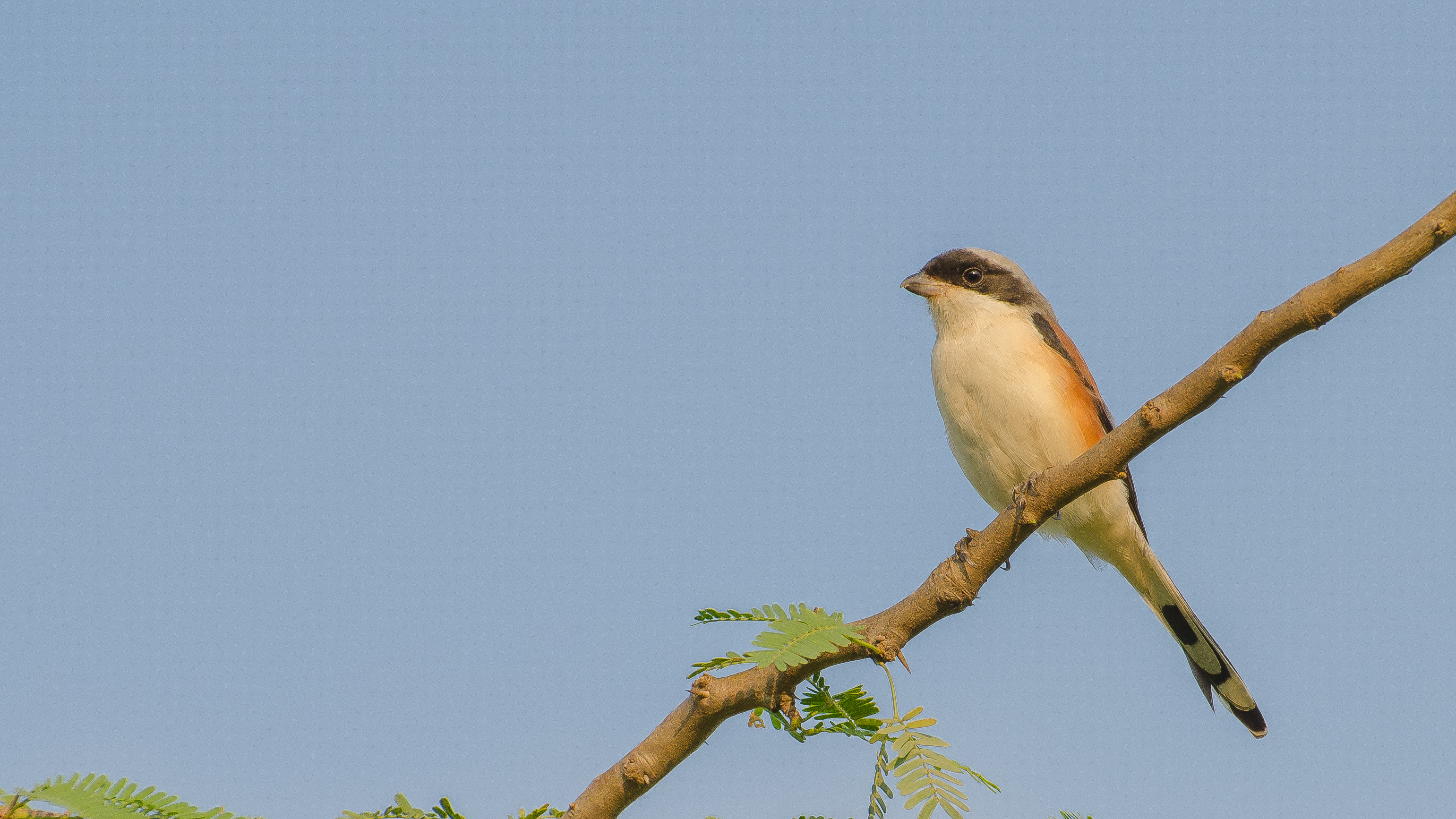
Bay-backed shrike (Lanius vittatus)

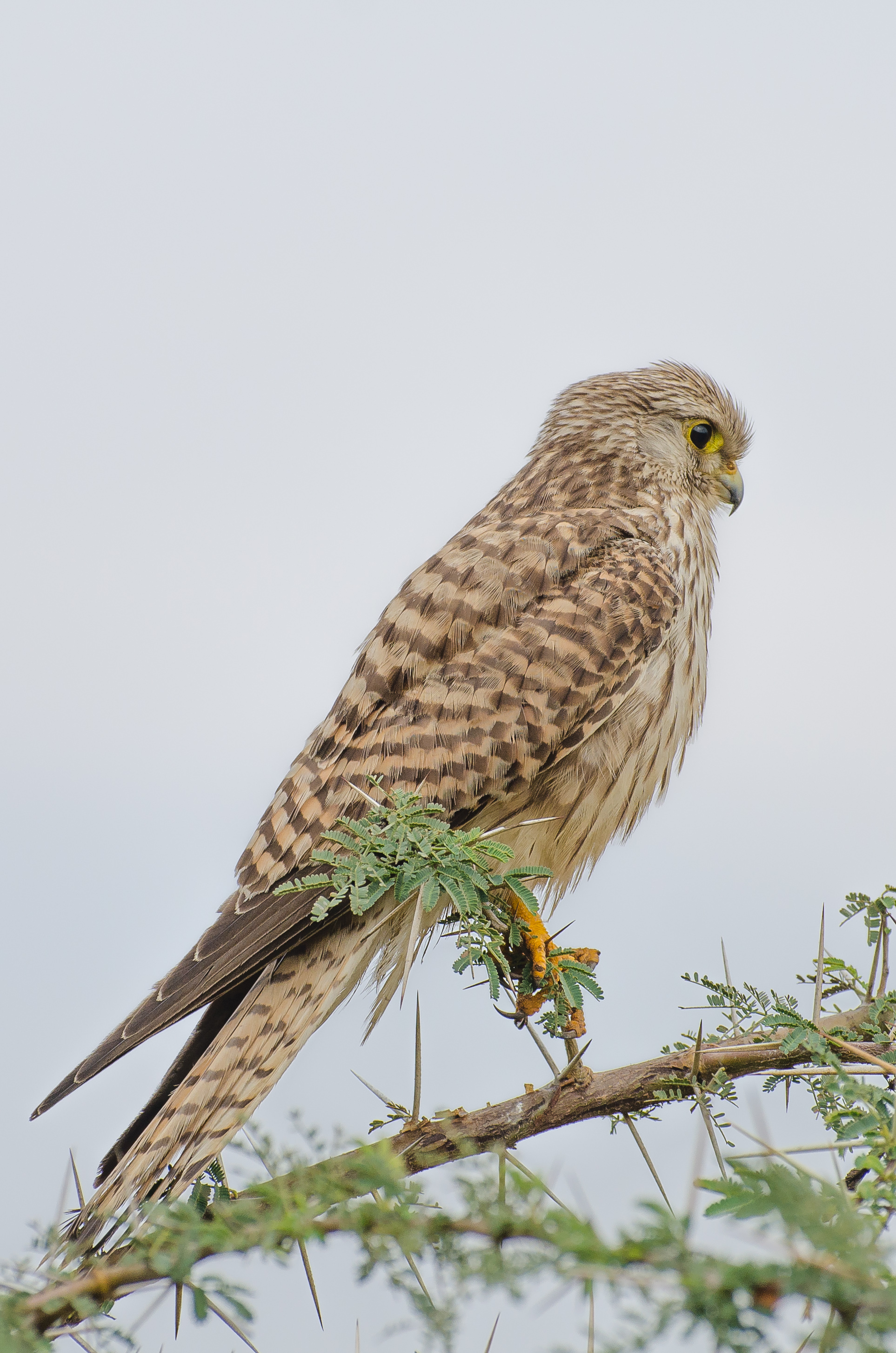
Common kestrel (Falco tinnunculus)

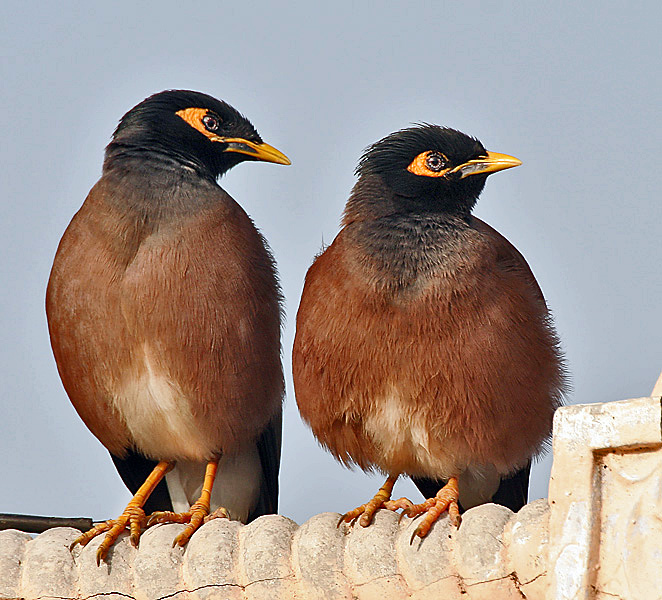
Common myna (Acridotheres tristis)

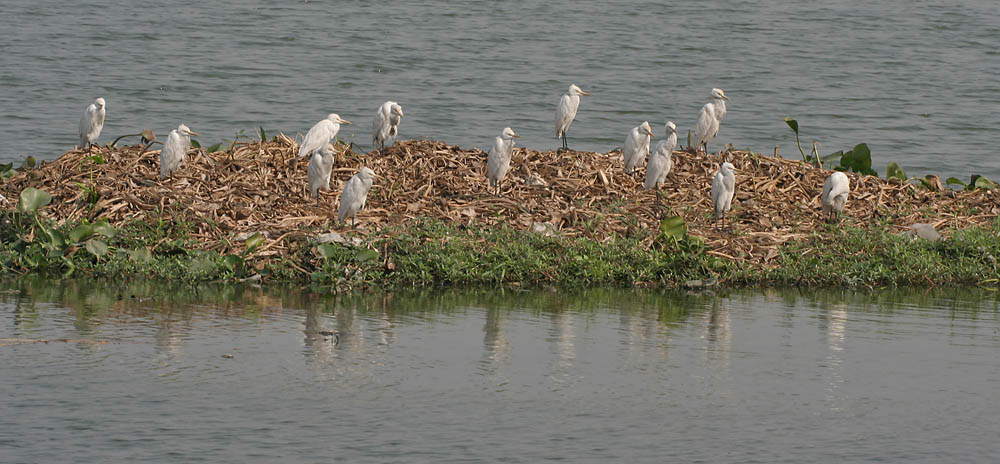
Cattle egrets (Bubulcus ibis)

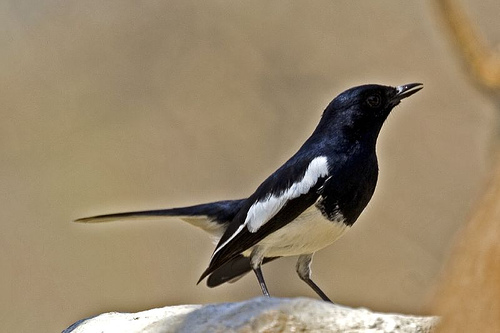
Oriental Magpie-robin (Copsychus saularis)

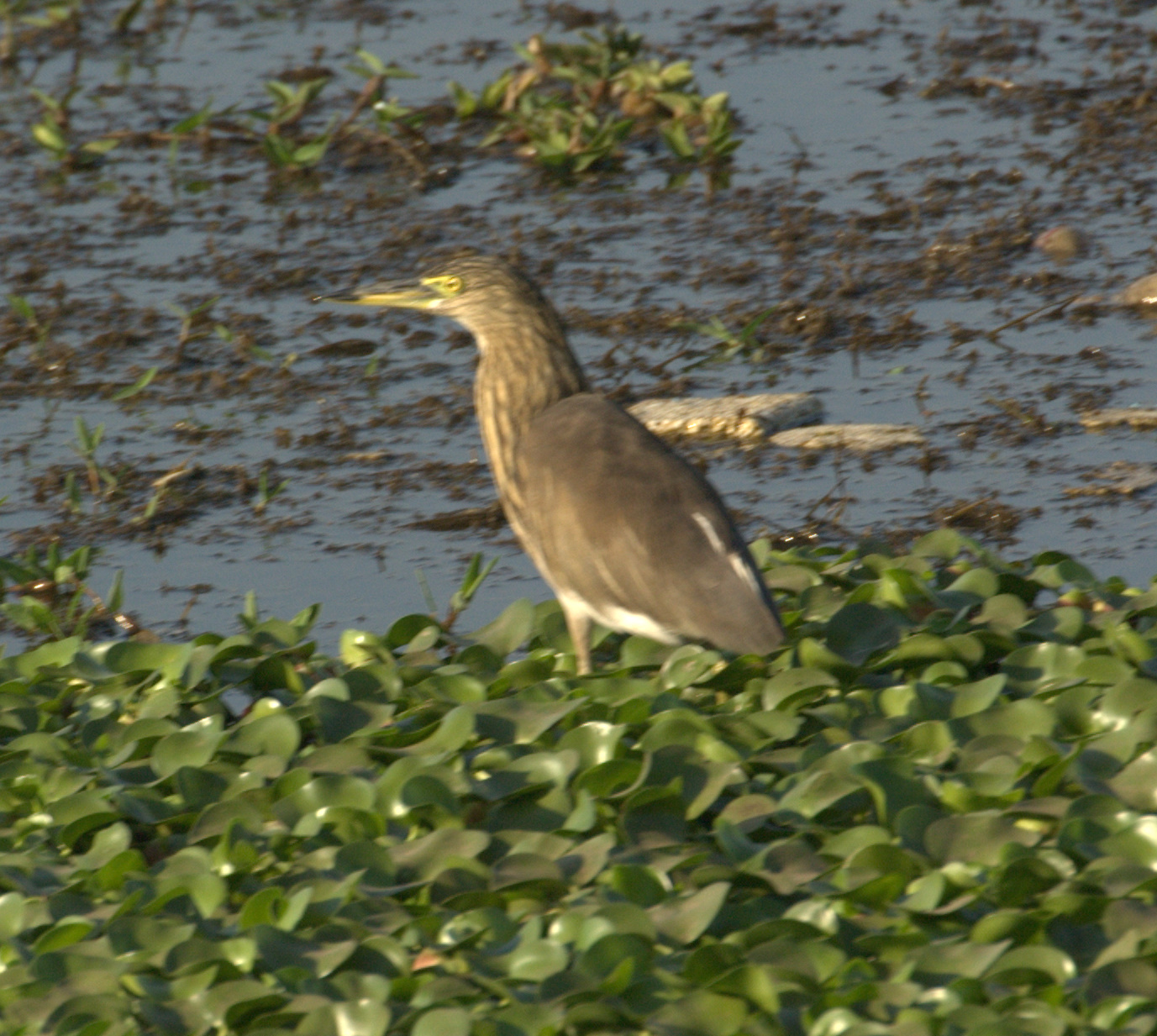
Indian pond heron (Ardeola grayii)

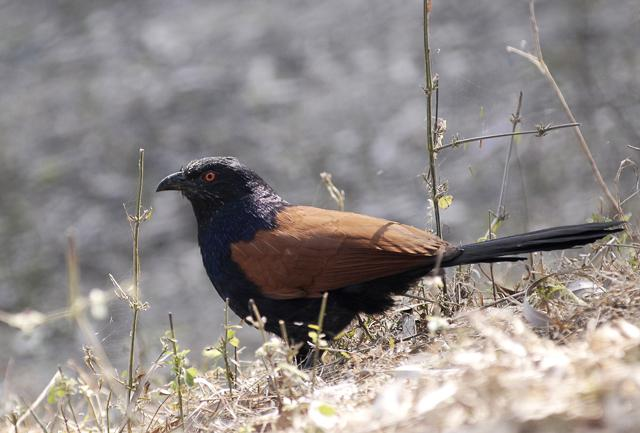
Greater Coucal (Southern) (Centropus sinensis)

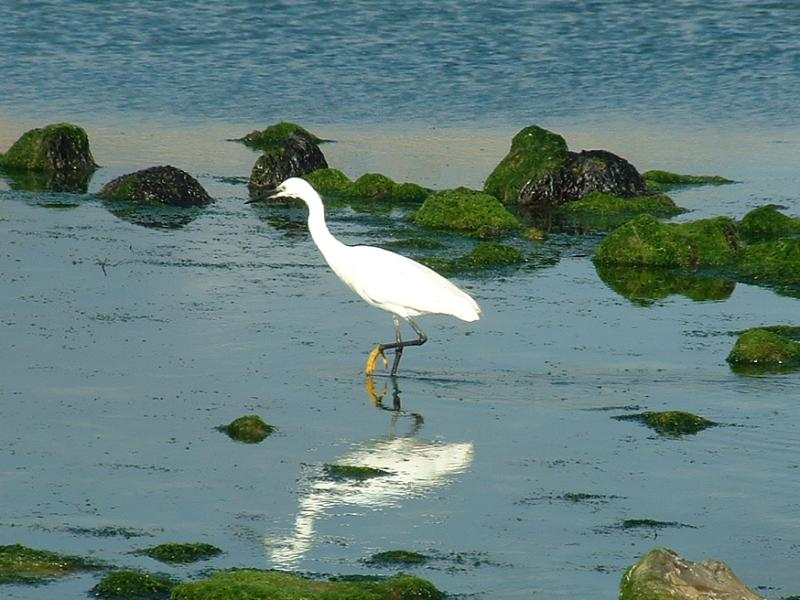
Little egret (Egretta garzetta)

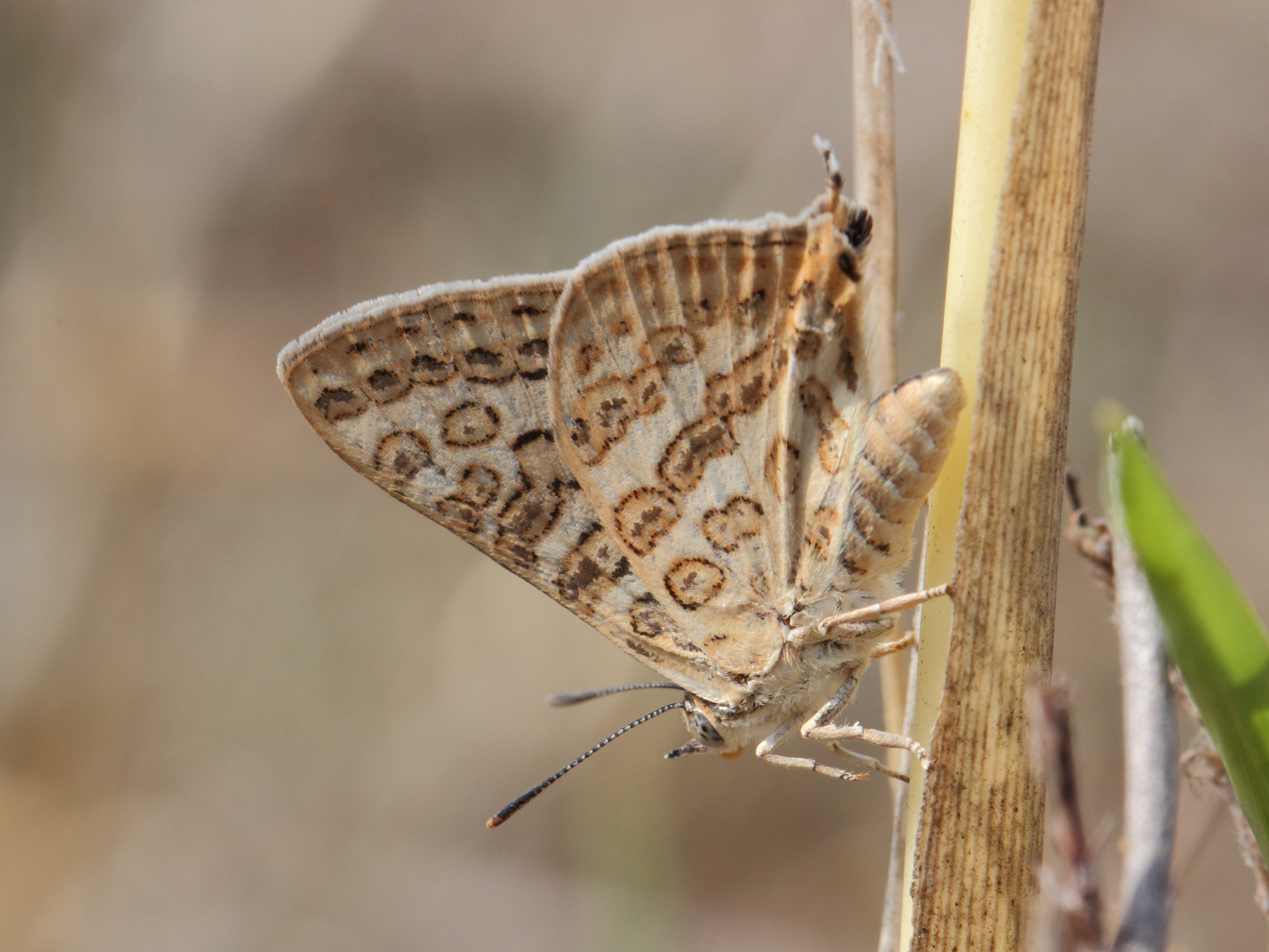
Lilac Silverline (Aphnaeus lilacinus)

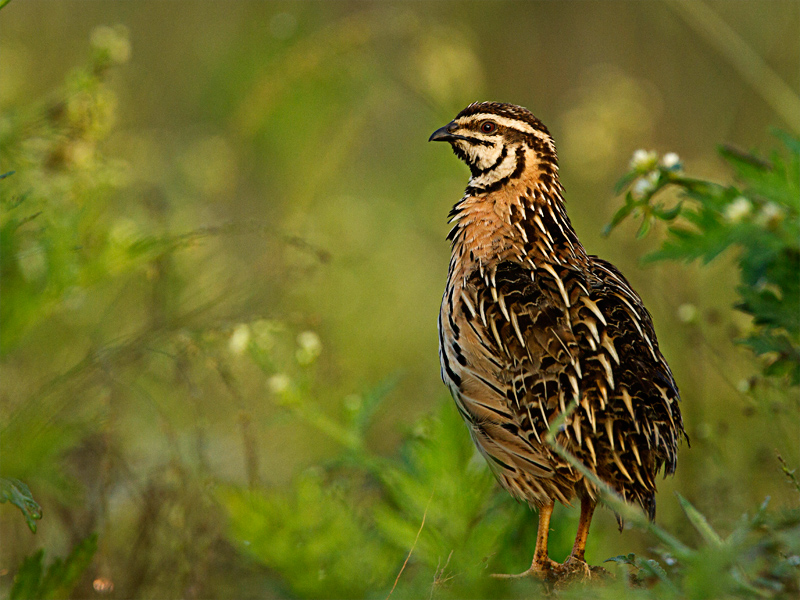
A male Rain Quail

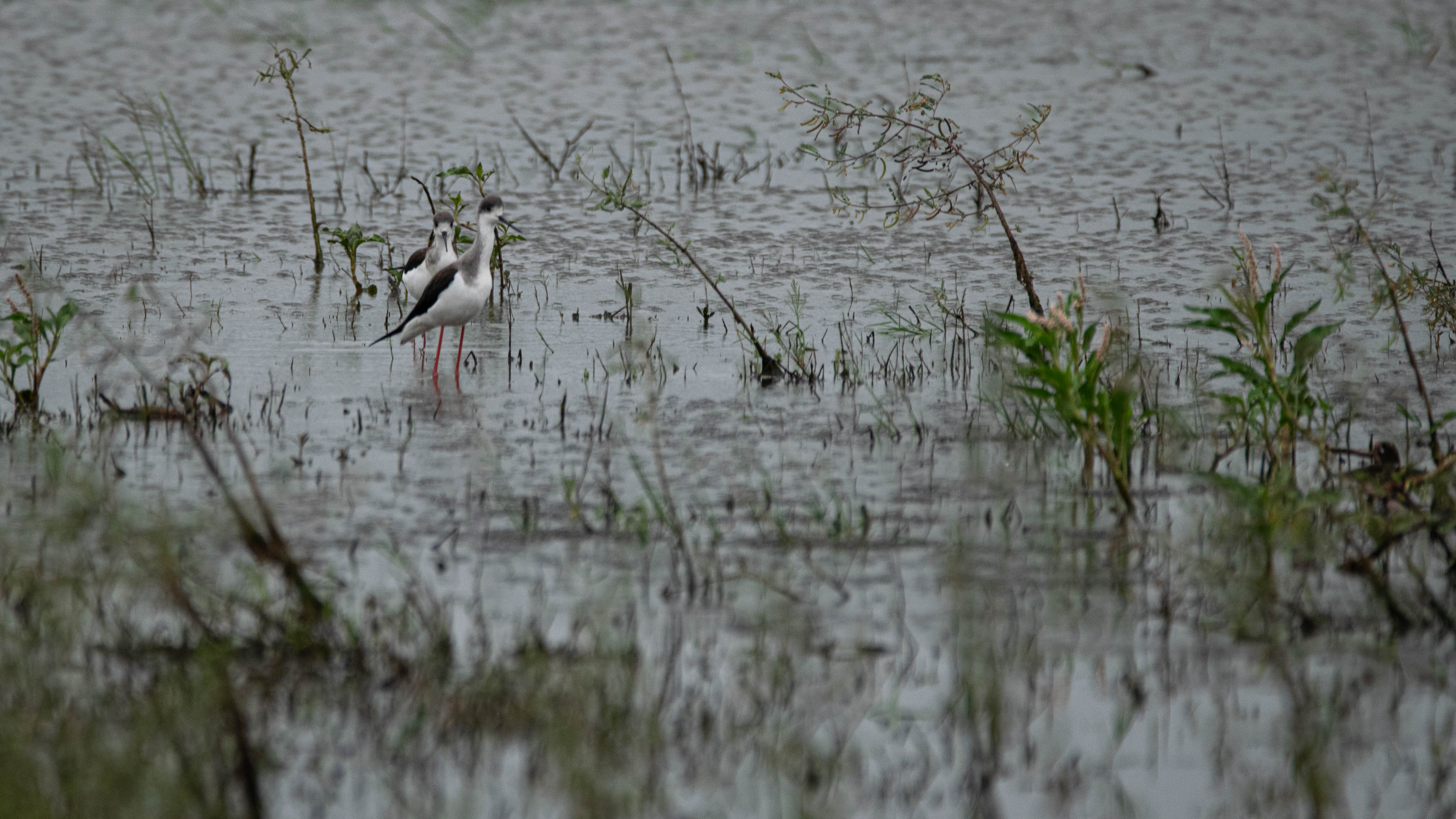
Black-winged stilts
