= Nrityagram =

Intentional community in India

Coordinates: 13.161°N 77.45°E

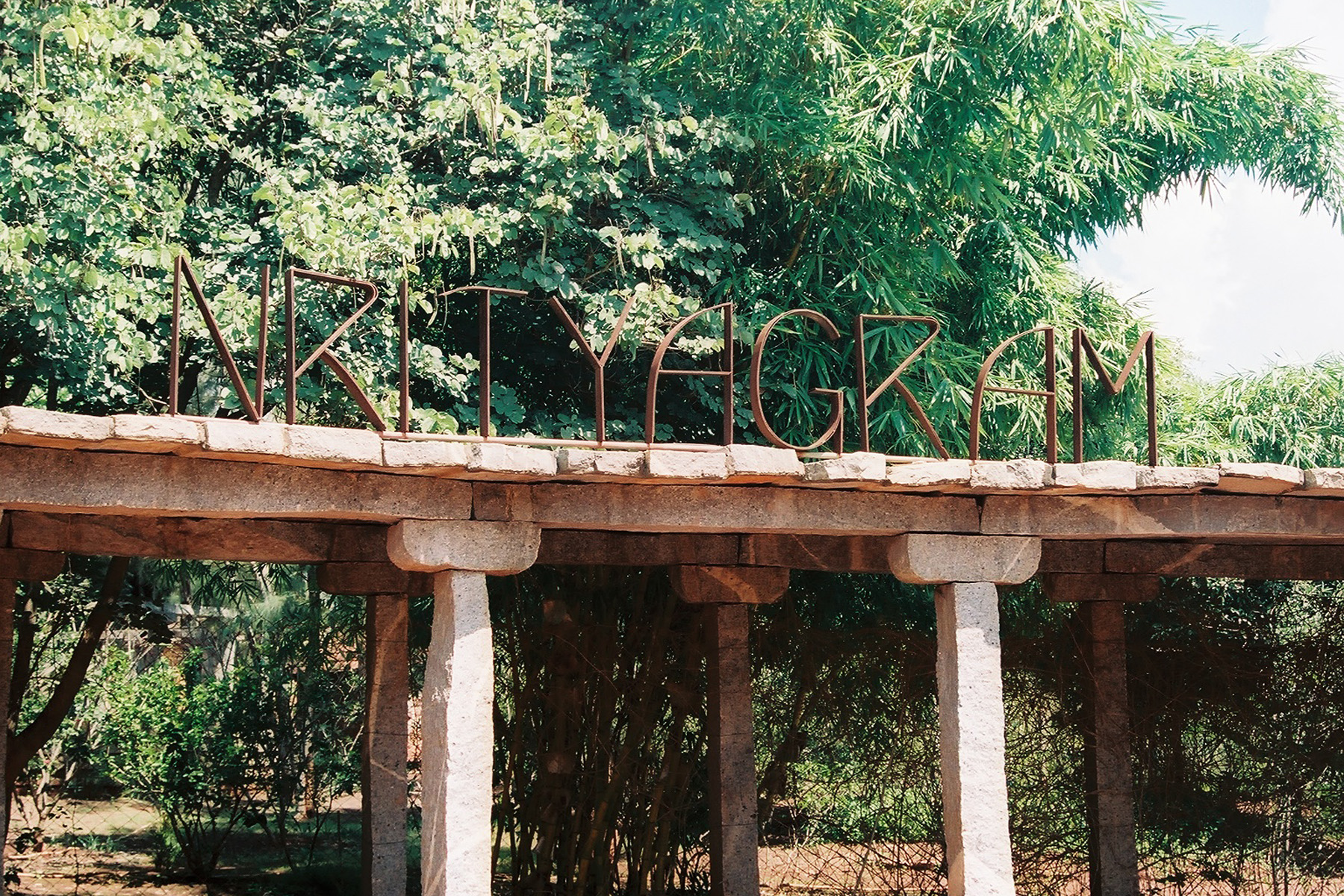
- Entrance to the Nrityagram Dance Community
- Formation: 11 May 1990
- Purpose: Dance school for Indian classical dance
- Location: Hesaraghatta, Bengaluru-560 088, Karnataka, India
- Website: Official website

Nrityagram is India's first modern Gurukul (residential school) for Indian classical dances and an intentional community in the form of a dance village, set up by Odissi dancer Protima Gauri in 1985. The residential school offers training in Indian classical dance forms, Odissi, Mohiniattam, Kathak, Bharatnatyam, Kuchipudi, Kathakali and Manipuri, eight hours a day, six days a week for seven years, following the ancient Guru-shishya tradition. Designed by famous Indian architect Gerard da Cunha, the community is situated near Hesaraghatta Lake 30 km from Bengaluru. Today the Nrityagram Dance Ensemble has performed across India and in many countries abroad.

== History ==
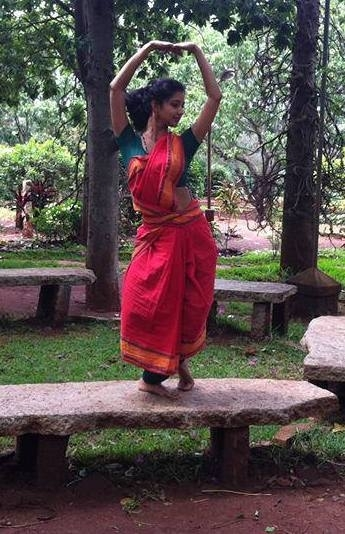
Classical dancer Soumya Sampath, displaying her expression at the Nrityagram's garden.

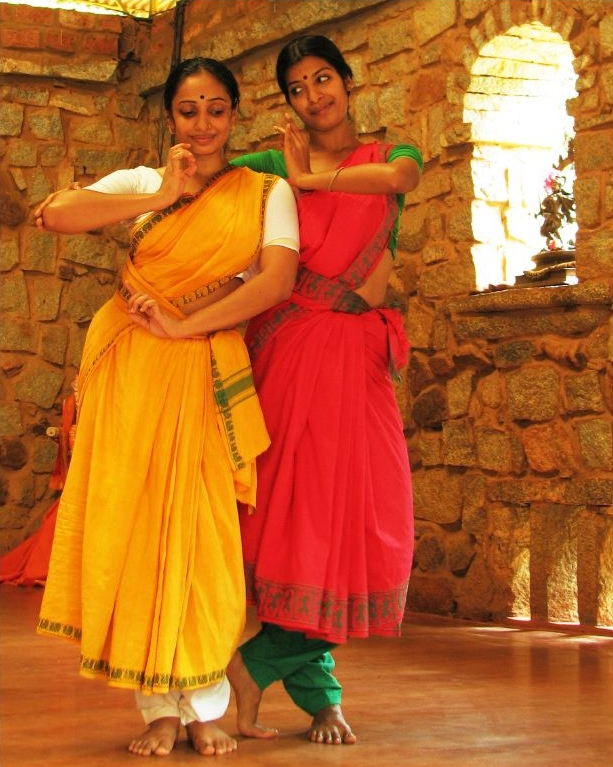
Classical Dancers at Nrityagram.

The word Nrityagram, literally translated, means "dance village," and in the founder, Protima Gauri's own words,

"It is a community of dancers in a forsaken place amidst nature. A place where nothing exists, except dance. A place where you breathe, eat, sleep, dream, talk, imagine - dance. A place where all the five senses can be refined to perfection. A place where dancers drop negative qualities such as jealousy, small-mindedness, greed and malice to embrace their colleagues as sisters and support each other in their journey towards becoming dancers of merit."

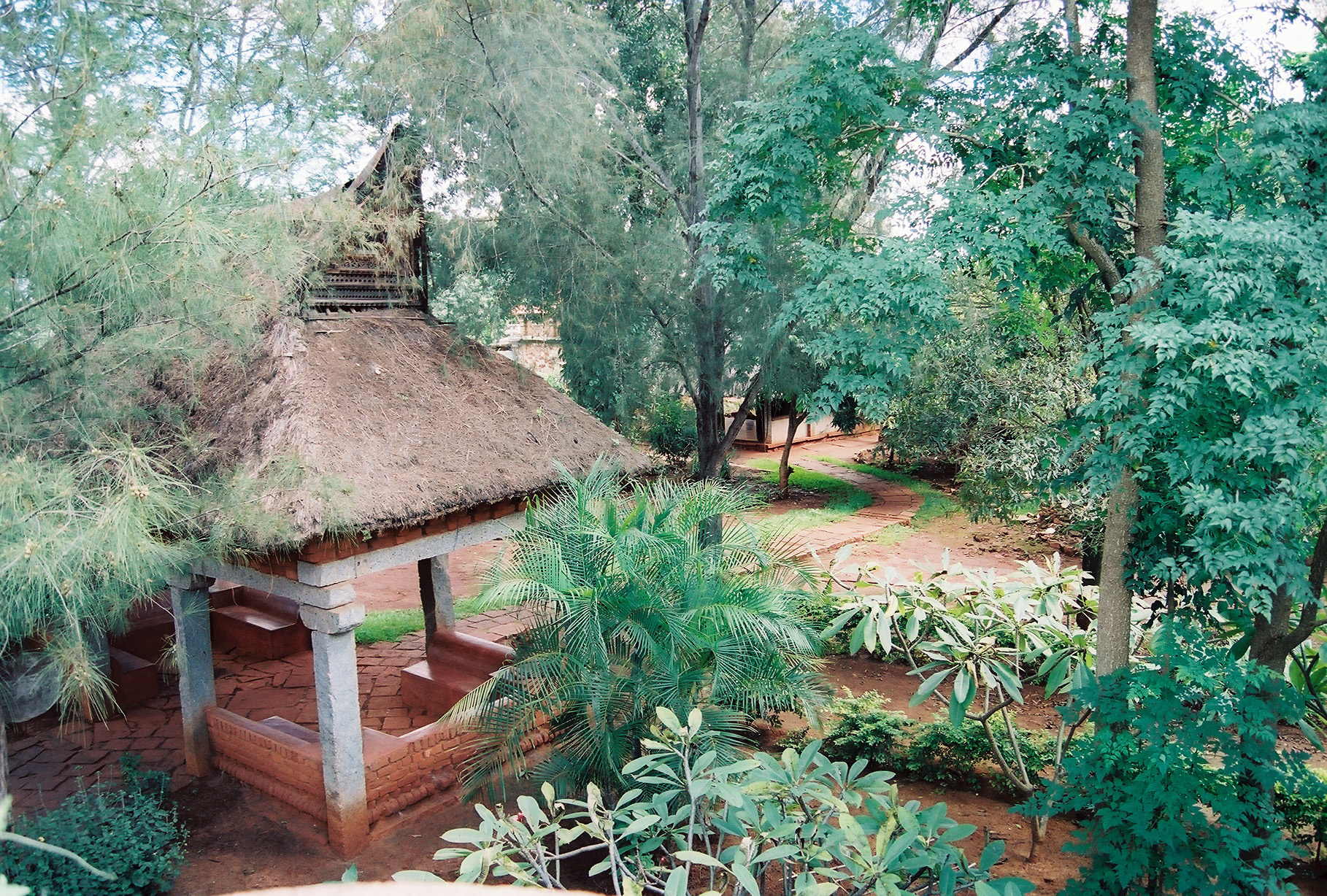
Grounds and gardens of the Nrityagram following vernacular architecture.

Protima left Mumbai to start the dance village, the land was given on lease by state government, by the then Chief Minister Ramakrishna Hegde and by 1990s the institution had taken root, formally inaugurated on 11 May 1990, by the then Prime Minister, V.P. Singh. Being designed by the well- reputed Indian architect Gerard da Cunha, the building started coming up soon after, following the vernacular architecture of the region. The Nrityagram Dance Ensemble made its New York debut in 1996, receiving rave reviews.

Lynne Fernandez, a Delhi-based theatre actress and light designer, first came to Nrityagram in December 1995 to coordinate Surupa Sen's debut and the Nrityagram ensemble's trip abroad. After Protima suffered a mild heart attack, Lynn became actively involved in managing the institution, as Protima gradually withdrew. Eventually, Protima formally handed over Nrityagram to Lynne Fernandez on 10 July 1997, who became the Managing Trustee of the institution. Subsequently, in August, Protima Gauri set off on her pilgrimage to Kailash Mansarovar and it was there that she died in the Malpa landslide, near Pithoragarh on the night of 18 August 1997. Since then, Nrityagram has grown in stature. Gurus and students work in the fields within the Nrityagram, which has 10 acres of land, and grow their own food. Over the years, only the Odissi gurukul has been functional due to paucity of funds.

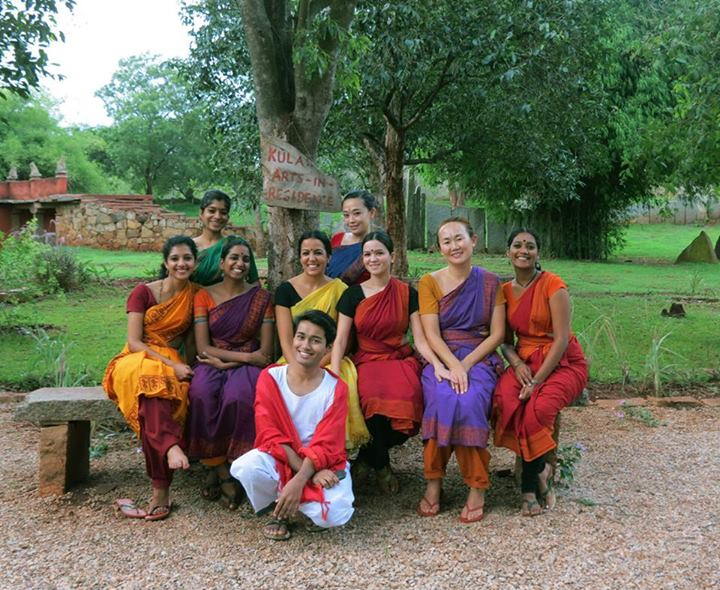
Classical dancers are relaxing at Nrityagram garden.

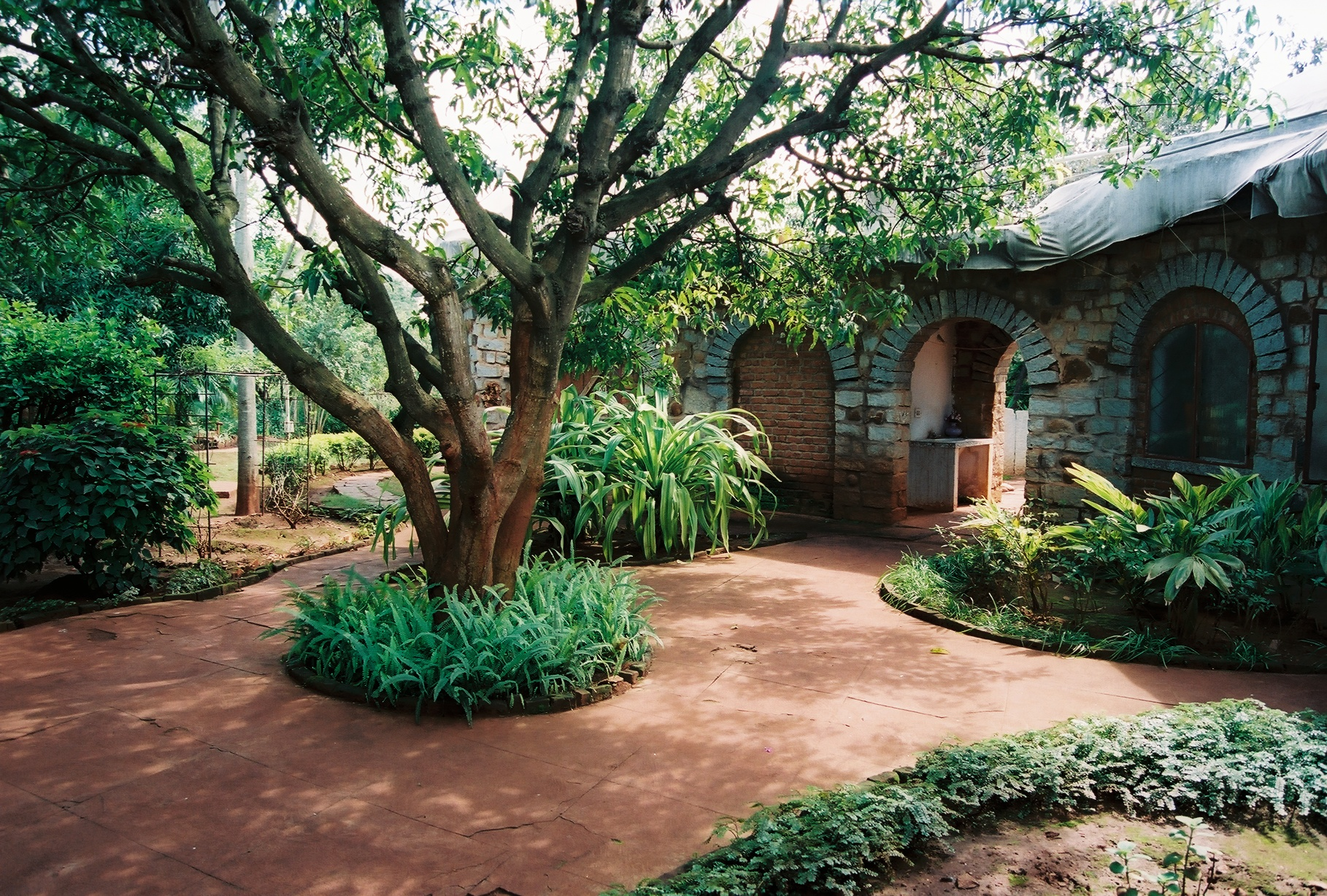
Buildings in the Nrityagram

Surupa Sen who first came as a student, debuted in 1995, later became artistic director of Nrityagram in 1997, and remains to date. Orissa Dance Academy (ODA) student Bijayini Satpathy who was first student of Nrityagram, is now in charge of the Odissi gurukul. Some of Nrityagram's few but meritorious students include, Pavithra Reddy, who has had her solo debut in 2003 and who will be hopefully seen in some solo pieces on a wider platform very soon. She has spent almost 12 years as a residential student at Nrityagram, and has learnt under the tutelage of Surupa Sen and Bijayini Satpathy. Ayona Bhaduri and Priyambada Patnaik are also students at this gurukul. They both joined Nrityagram in 1998 and have been a part of the ensemble since 2001. Vasanta Habba, a cultural event organised by Nrityagram is known as the classical Woodstock of India, first started in 1994 by Protima, held on first Saturday of February every year, and soon it became the famous annual night-long festival of arts that had 40,000 visitors when it was last held in 2004. When the 2004 tsunami struck, the subsequent 2005 event was cancelled, and community hasn't been able to regroup since, though it hopes to restart it in 2011. A 30-minute documentary on the dance village, Nrityagram: For the Love of Dance, directed and produced by Nan Melville was premiered at the annual Dance on Camera Festival, in New York City on 25 January 2010 to which dance critic Alastair Macaulay of the New York Times responded, .."much of the dance footage, not least during the closing credits, is spellbinding. I wanted the film to be twice as long."

== Nrityagram Dance Ensemble ==
The 1996 New York debut of the Nrityagram Dance Ensemble, with Surupa Sen, Bijayini Satpathy, Anitha Nair, Pavithra Reddy and Jaya Mukherjee was called, "one of the most luminous dance events of the year" by Jennifer Dunning, the dance critic of the New York Times. After its New York debut, the Nrityagram Dance Ensemble has performed to sold-out shows in Hawai and Bozeman, USA, Middle East, Far East and Europe, and in time created a niche for itself in the world of dance. Today, apart from lead dancer-choreographers, Surupa Sen and Bijayini Satpathy, Pavitra Reddy, Rasmi Raj and Manasi Tripathy are the other permanent dancers of the Ensemble, and are accompanied by musicians like Swain playing the percussion instrument, Mardala, Srinibas Satapathy’s on Bamboo flute (Bansuri) and Sanjib Kumar Kunda on the violin. Its first full-length production "Sri - In Search of the Goddess", was premiered in Delhi in 2001 and in the United States in 2002-2003, to critical acclaim. Since then it created several productions including, "Ansh", "Sacred Space" (2005), and "Separation and the Duality of the human spirit" (2008)

By 2008, the ensemble had made 12 tours of the US, its 2006 production, Vibhakta (The Division), by Surupa Sen which was performed together by Surupa Sen, the artistic director, and Bijayini Satpathy was listed in "The Ten Best Dance Performances of 2008" by dance critic Joan Acocella of The New Yorker. and prior to it in February 2008, the Ensemble had the world premiere of "Pratima: Reflection", at New York City, Joyce Theater. It has also performed at Pittsburgh Dance Council (2002). As of 2010, the ensemble members included, Surupa Sen, Bijayini Satpathy, Pavithra Reddy, Rasmi Raj and Manasi Tripathy.

== Temple of dedication ==
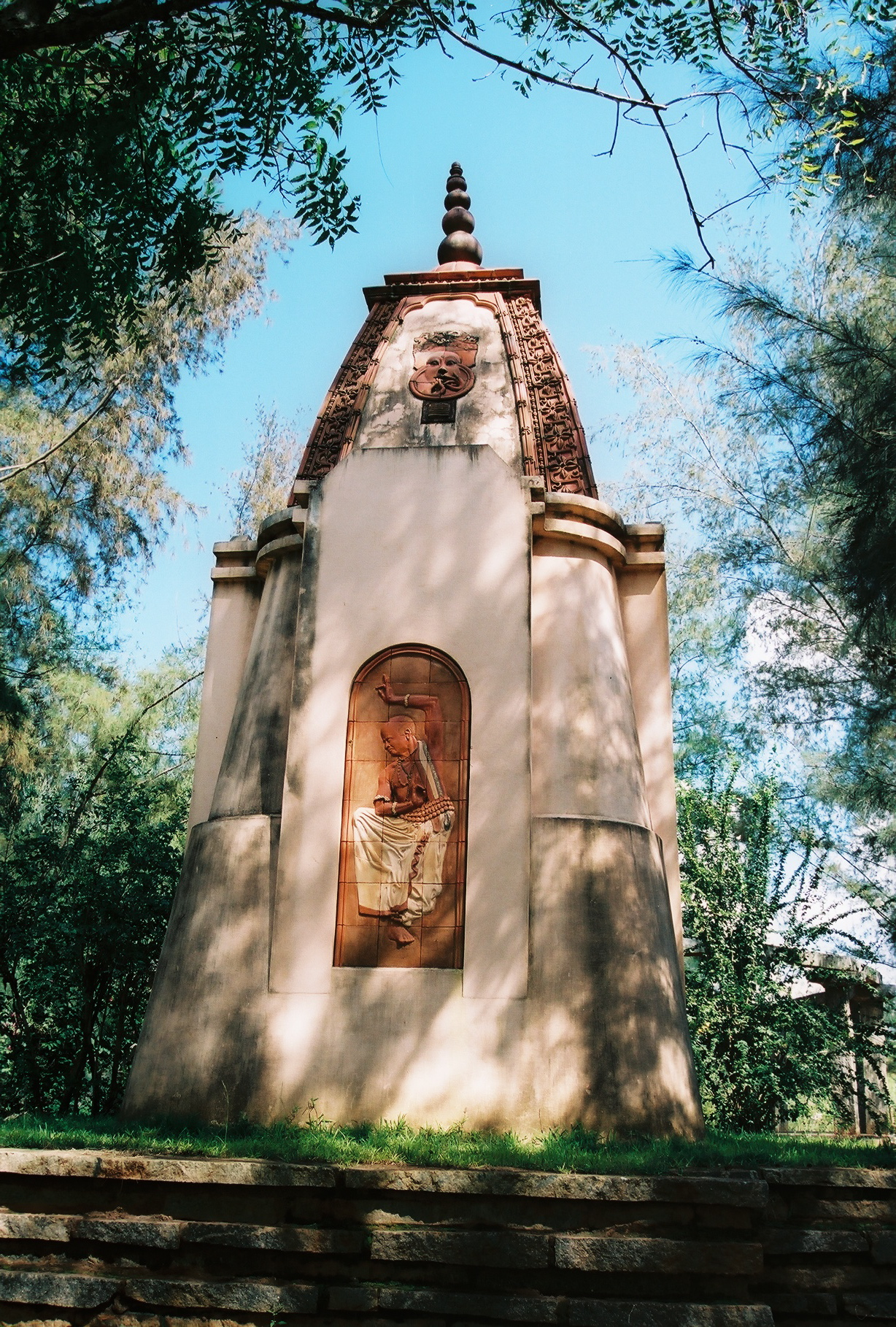
Temple at Nrityagram entrance

A thoughtfully evolved temple (pictured), built in 1998, welcomes people to the Nrityagram, near Hesaraghatta Lake, it depicts the image of Kelucharan Mohapatra, guru of founder Protima Bedi in a dancing pose. The caption given for the picture states:

Temple at Nrityagram. Fashioned from the raw mud of Nrityagram and fired after it was built, the temple is dedicated to space. It is decorated with panels depicting the elements, dance motifs, mudras and designs from costumes and ghungroos. Inside is a granite rock scooped out to hold water and a flame that stays lit.

== Gallery ==
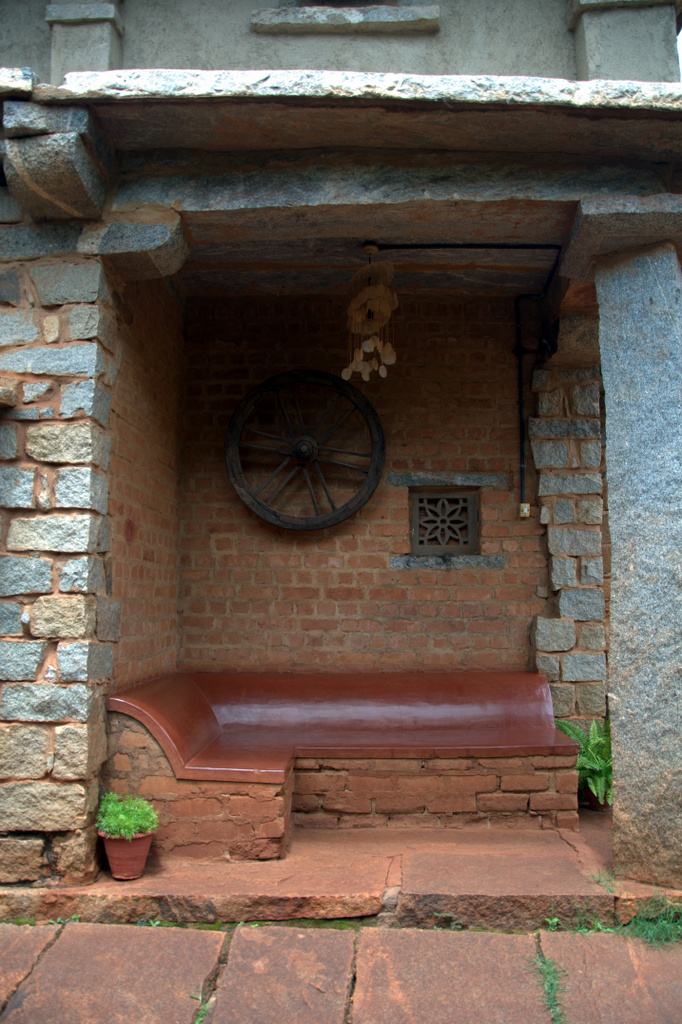

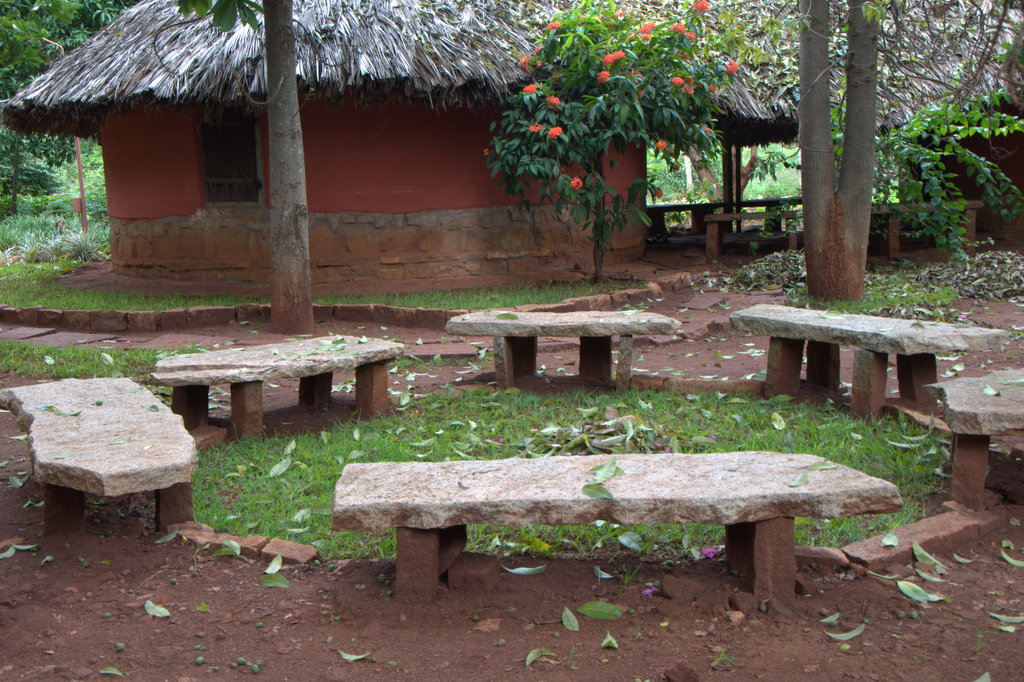

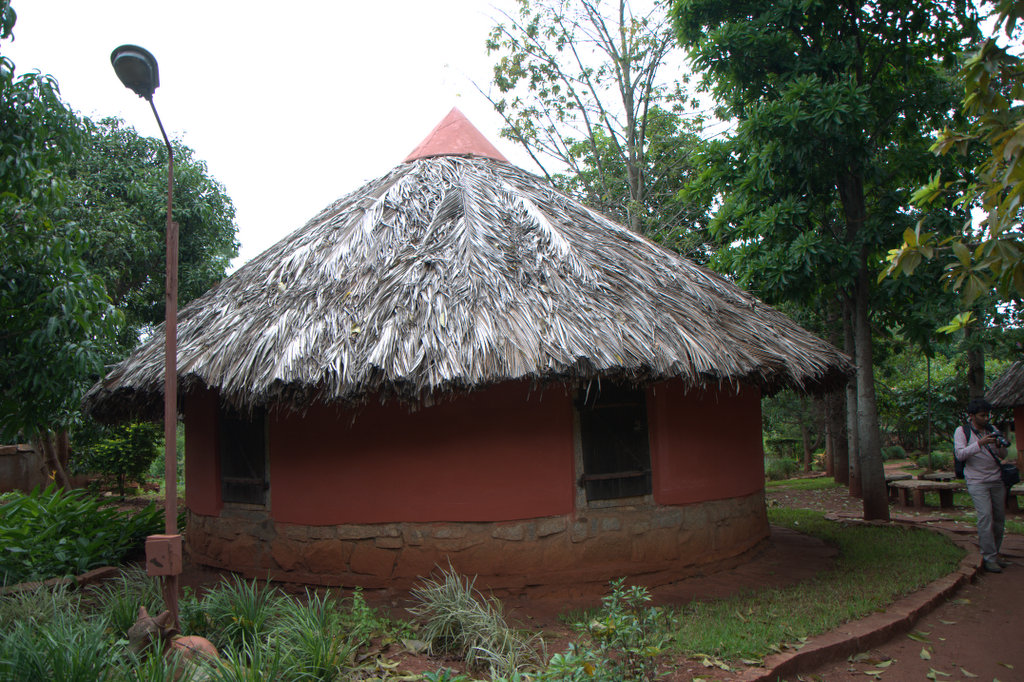

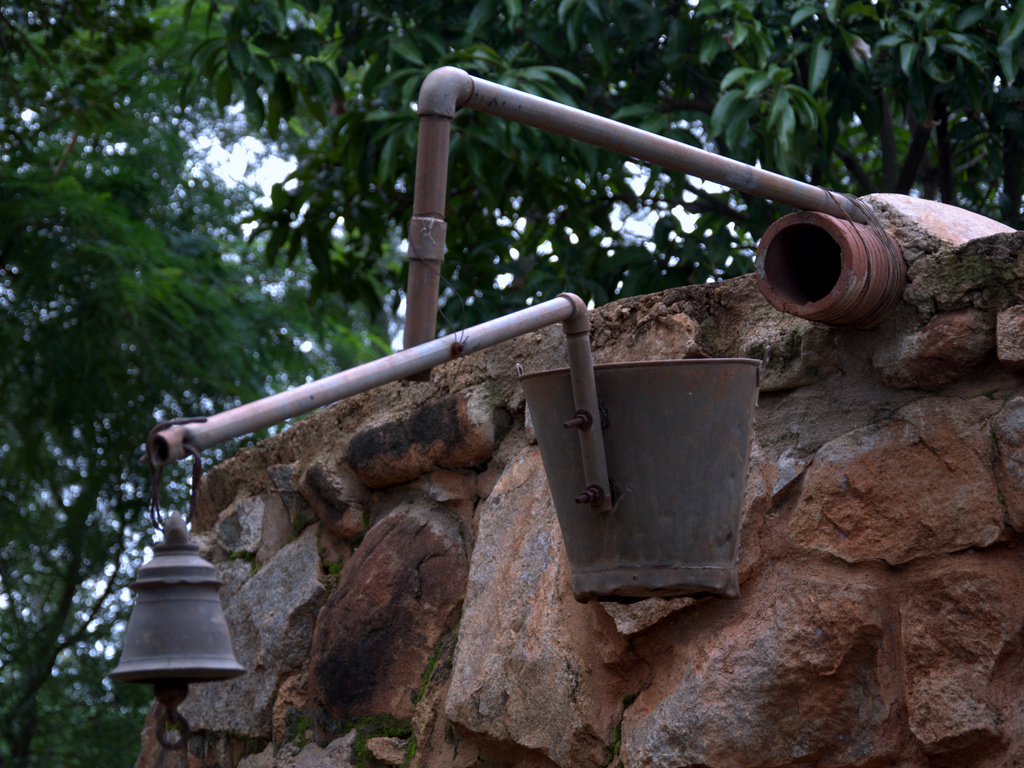

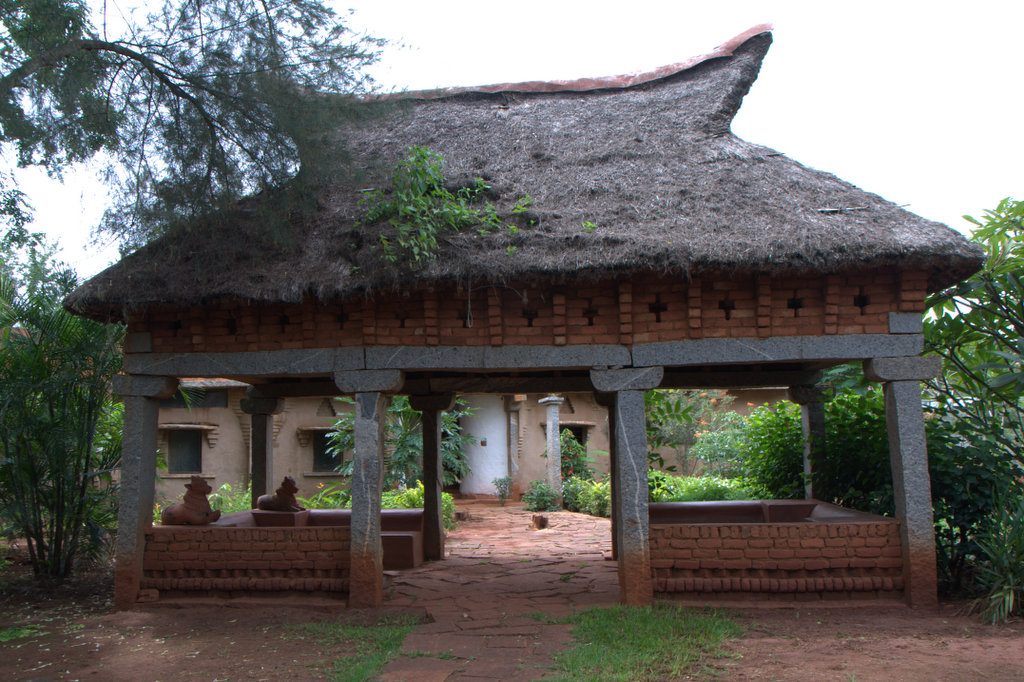

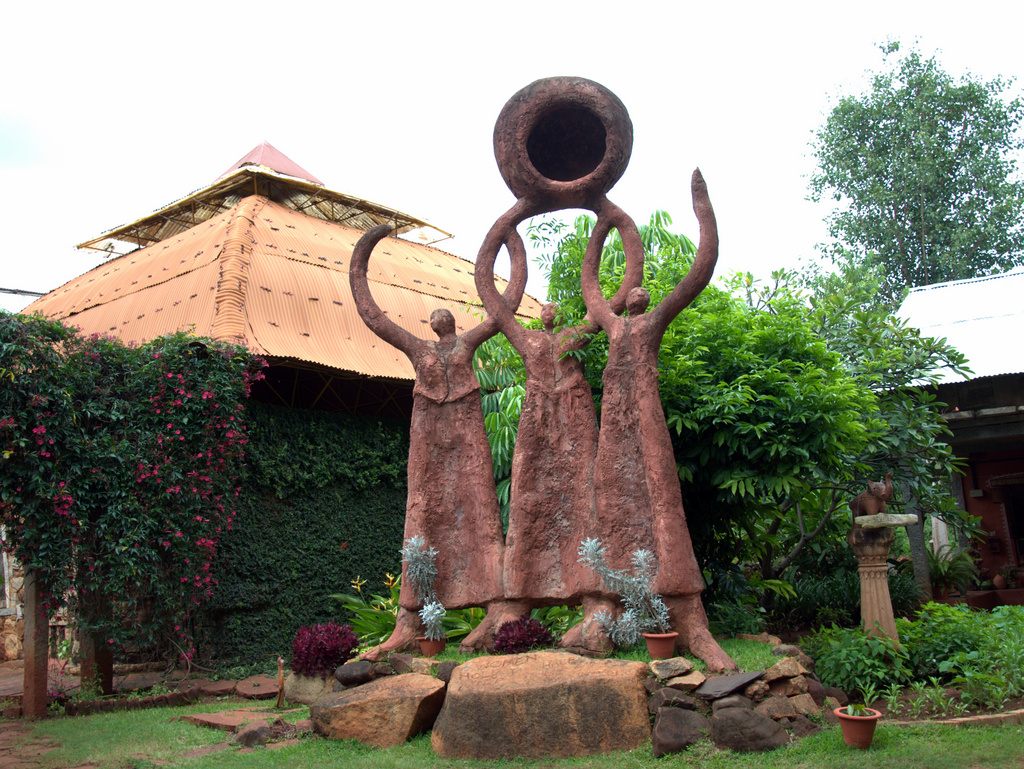

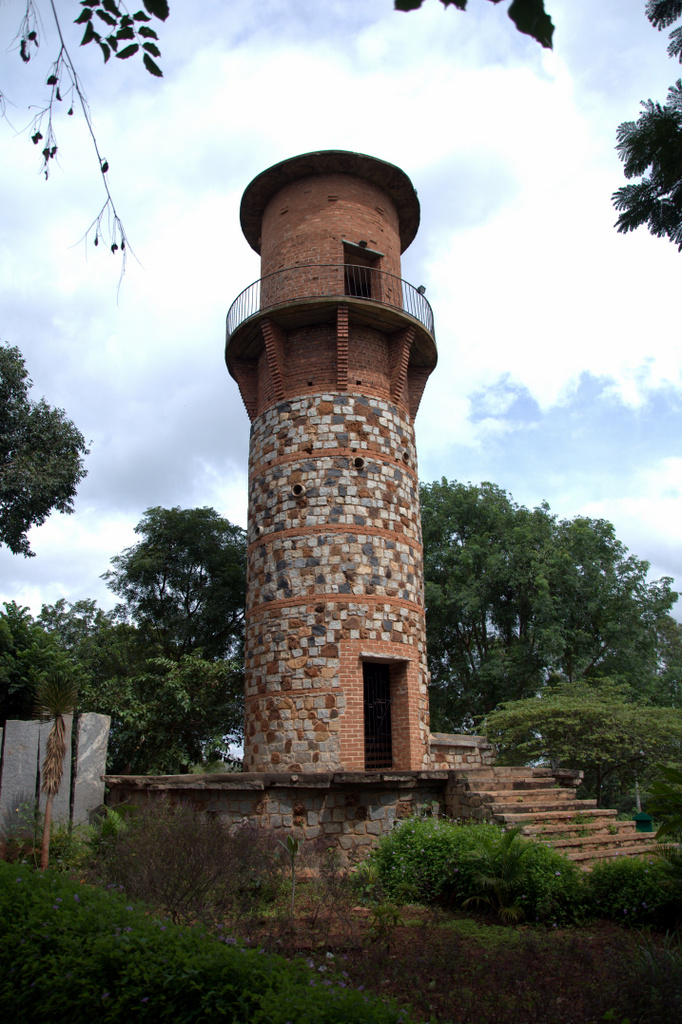

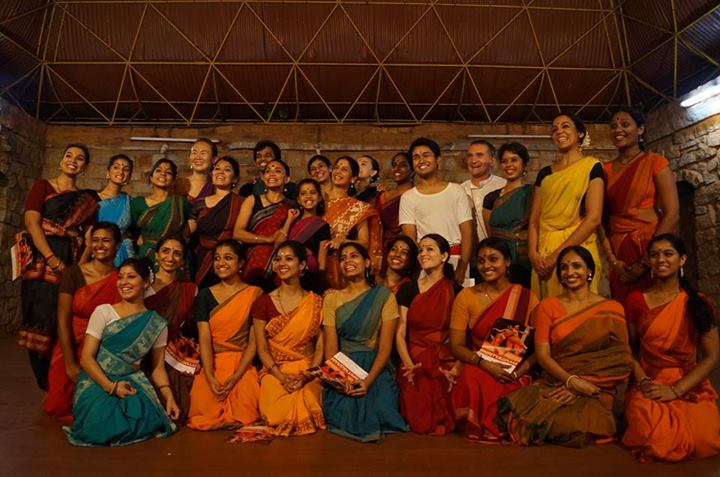
Classical Dancers Of Nrityagram, including Bijayini Sathpathi And Swarupa Sen, 2013
