= Gerard da Cunha =

Indian architect (born 1955)

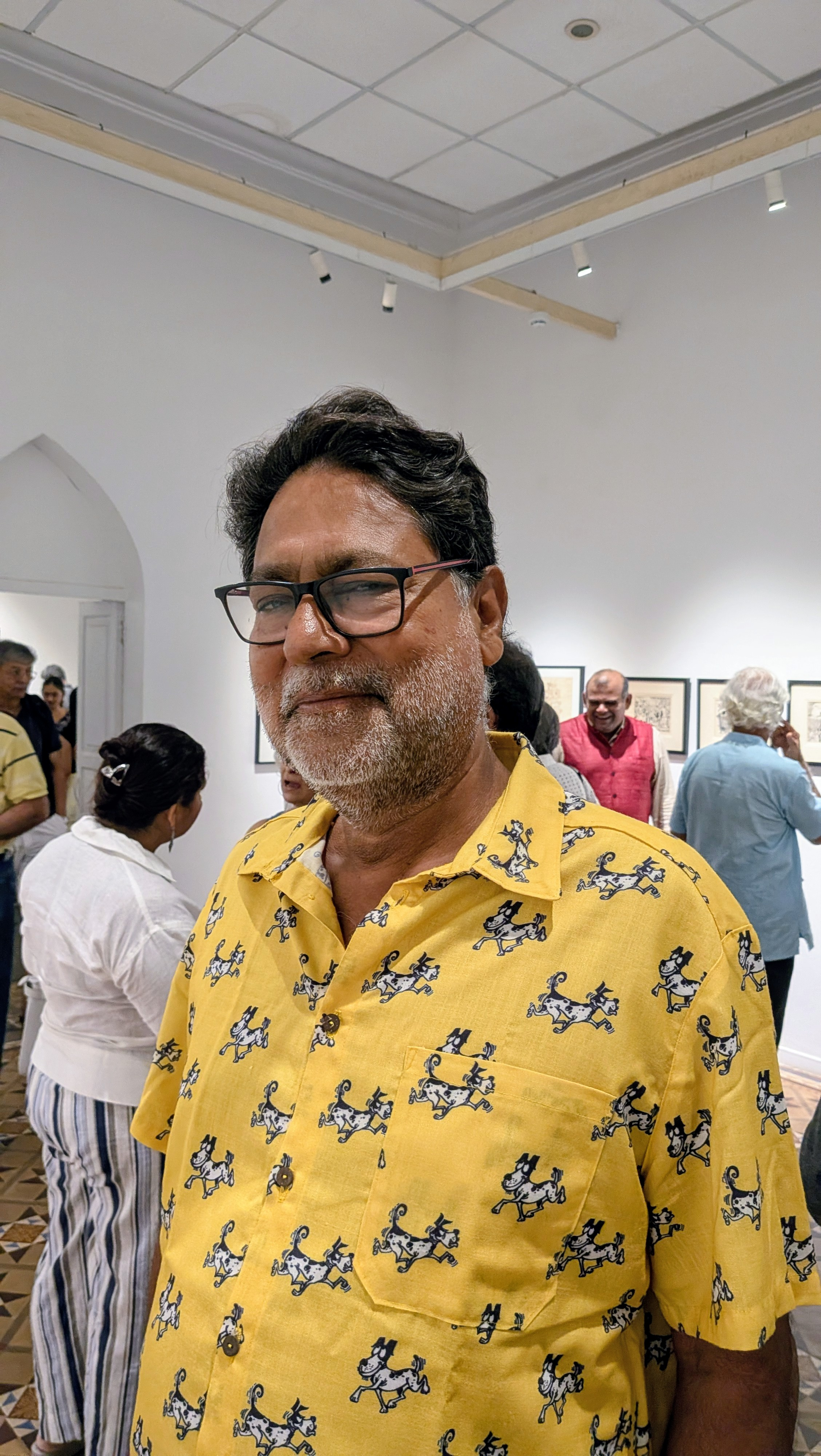
- Cunha in 2026
- Born: 10 February 1955 (age 71); Godhra, Bombay State, India
- Education: School of Planning and Architecture
- Occupation: Architect
- Years active: 1970s–present
- Spouses: Nisha da Cunha (died 2022)
- Partner: Arundhati Roy (1978–1982)
- Children: 2

Gerard da Cunha (born 10 February 1955) is an Indian architect based in Goa, India. He is the founder and principal architect of the architecture firm Architecture Autonomous. An alumnus of the School of Planning and Architecture, New Delhi, he is known for utilizing locally available materials and traditional construction techniques in harmony with its ecosystem.

== Early life ==
Gerard da Cunha was born on 10 February 1955 in the city of Godhra, Bombay State (now Gujarat), da Cunha travelled across the country since childhood as his father worked with the State Bank of India and had a transferable job. He did most of his schooling at St. Mary's in Mazgaon, Maharashtra.

Later, he studied at the prestigious School of Planning and Architecture, Delhi, which is regarded as the best institution in the country for architecture. During his 3rd year at SPA, da Cunha took a one-year break from the school and travelled to Kerala to work closely with the world-renowned architect Laurie Baker, whom he greatly admired.

After his course in architecture from School of Planning and Architecture (SPA), da Cunha joined DDA in 1979, but he found the experience of working there extremely monotonous. Bored with his job, he went to Goa (his home state), hoping for some exciting element in his life.

== Career ==
Da Cunha runs his architecture firm Architecture Autonomous in Goa, India. His projects are spread across the country, including resorts, townships, institutions, and even private residences. He maintains his practice in Goa, which he considers has a novel history in that it was the site of the 'first sustained encounter between the East and the West'. This encounter has engendered a unique culture and architecture that is evident in da Cunha's lively and rather Gaudíesque work.

== Personal life ==
Da Cunha began a relationship with Indian writer and author Arundhati Roy, moving in with her in 1978 in Delhi. They subsequently moved to Goa and later separated in 1982.

He later married Nisha da Cunha (née da Costa), an educationist who died from cardiac arrest in 2022 at the age of 63. Together they had two children, Nyhna and Taariq.

== Works ==
Da Cunha has been the architect of several projects which find places all across India. These include Nrityagram of Bangalore, Hampi's Kannada University's main building and its library, Bangalore's Taj Kutiram Tourist Resort, the Central Library in Panjim, JVSL Township in Torangallu, a house for Mr. Sajjan Jindal at Torangallu, a tourist village in Kerala, and Jimi Gazhdhar's lavish mansion on the banks of the Goan river, to name a few. Da Cunha's projects mostly portray the use of natural materials.

One of the most impressive and unusual works of da Cunha's has been the township which he has built for the JSW Steel Plant, about 30 km from Hampi, called Vidyanagar. The entire project was built at a cost of Rs 150 crore. This township is spread across 300 acres, and the project involved creating housing to settle 10,000 people. With not even a single tree on the site, creating an entire township seemed to be an arduous task. The township also has a movie theatre, school, airstrip, parks, and botanical garden. It also houses a club, temples, a shopping centre, and restaurants, thus making it a complete city. This unusual project of creating an entire township from scratch got da Cunha the Prime Minister's Award for Excellence in Urban Planning and Design offered by the Ministry of Urban Development in 1998–99.

Another project that gave da Cunha wide recognition is Nrityagram dance village at Bengaluru, designed for the famous Odissi dancer Protima Bedi. This center for the study of dance was built using traditional building forms and techniques, with stone and thatch being the primary materials. The whole concept of the "village" presents a mosaic of texture and colours, earth, bricks, tiles, and thatch. Nrityagram received the award for best rural architecture from the Vice-President of India in 1991.

Da Cunha was hired to restore the oldest fort in Goa, Reis Magos Fort, which lay in ruins for a long time. It has now become a successful tourist destination showcasing the history of Goa to the visitors. He also designed the Goa State Central Library located at Panaji (Panjim), which has six floors and houses more than 1,800,000 books.

Da Cunha has also won wide acclaim for the unusual and vernacular designs of two schools in Goa, Nisha's Play School and Shiksha Niketan. Set in a lush green valley with a steep slope, the architect has created different levels of spatial experiences connected vertically by a chute for children and stairs. Brick arches, sometimes set so low that adults have to stoop to enter, become the doorless entryways. The highlight of the outdoor amphitheater is the walls made from recycled beer bottles arranged in artistic patterns.

Just next to the school, da Cunha built a triangular ship-like building made of laterite stones, which is an architectural oddity in itself. It is called the "Houses of Goa" museum, designed and curated by da Cunha himself. The museum traces Goan architectural traditions, building materials, and styles in an in-depth manner.

Some other selected works by da Cunha include Town Plaza at Aamby Valley City.

== Awards and achievements ==
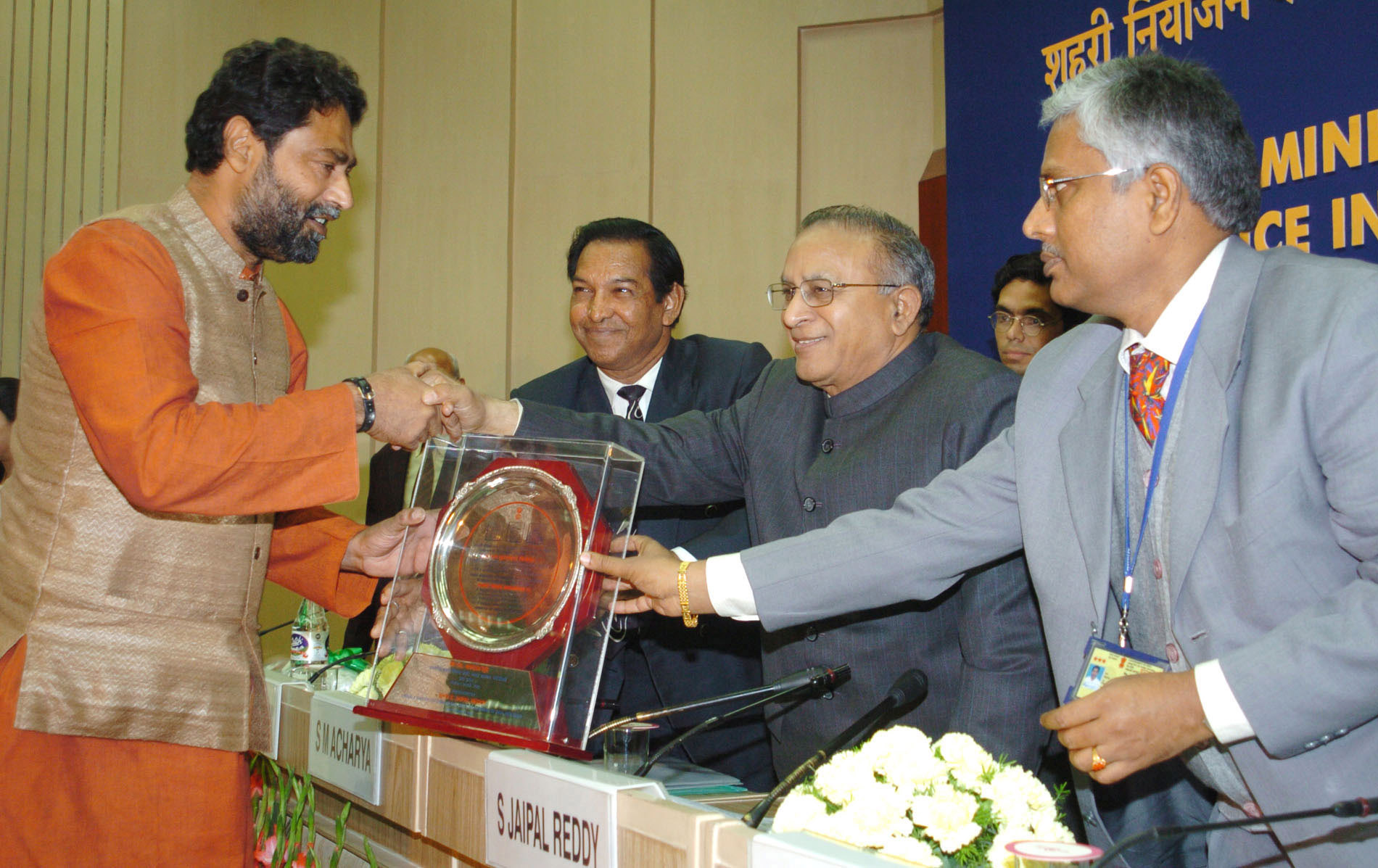
da Cunha (left) receiving the Prime Minister’s National Award for Excellence

Da Cunha won the prestigious Prime Minister's National Award for Excellence in Urban Planning and Design in 1998–99 for the project Jindal Vijaynagar Steel Limited (JVSL - Now JSW Township as "Vidhya Nagar"), Toranagallu, Bellary (Karnataka, India). He is also credited with winning the "Commendation Award-1990" for rural architecture for his project "Nrityagram" at Bengaluru, Karnataka. The design of Nrityagram can be termed as "Natural Architecture".

Da Cunha also made it into a shortlist of eight architects, being the only Indian architect in the list, invited by the Government of Japan's Furushima Prefecture region to draw up design proposals for a new capital city of Japan.
