= Kumudvathi River =

River in India

Kumudavathi River

Location
- Country: India
- State: Karnataka
- District: Bengaluru Rural

Physical characteristics
- Source: Kumbha Thirtha, Shivagange hills
  - location: Bengaluru Rural, Karnataka, India
  - coordinates: 13.169693°N 77.222919°E
- Mouth: Arkavathi River
  - location: Thippagondanahalli, Bengaluru Rural, India
  - coordinates: 12.974991°N 77.334829°E
- Length: 45 km (28 mi)approx.

The Kumudavathi river is a minor river that flows to the north west of the city of Bangalore. The river has largely dried up but there are ongoing efforts to rejuvenate it.

== Course ==
The river originates at Kumbha Thirtha in Shivagange hills and flows for 45 km before its confluence with the Arkavathi river at Thippagondanahalli (T.G.Halli) reservoir. The river basin is spread across 460 Sq. km and the entire catchment area encompasses 278 villages.

== Drying Up and Revival Efforts ==
Although water flow in the river had been decreasing, it only got attention in 2007 when the Thippagondanahalli reservoir fed by Kumudvathi River went dry. In February 2013, a large team of volunteers from the Art of Living (AOL) took up a project to rejuvenate the Kumudvathi river by using a scientific methodology. Over the course of the following years (2015-2016), the project built over 439 boulder checks, de-silted over 20 traditional stepwells, constructed 434 recharge wells and 71 water pools, built 45 recharge borewells, planted more than 425,000 saplings, besides spreading awareness to over 75,000 people residing in over 100 villages surrounding the river basin. 35 water pools were constructed in the 2015-16 across villages and they are reportedly able to sustain water even in mid-summer.
