= Arkavathi River =

River in India

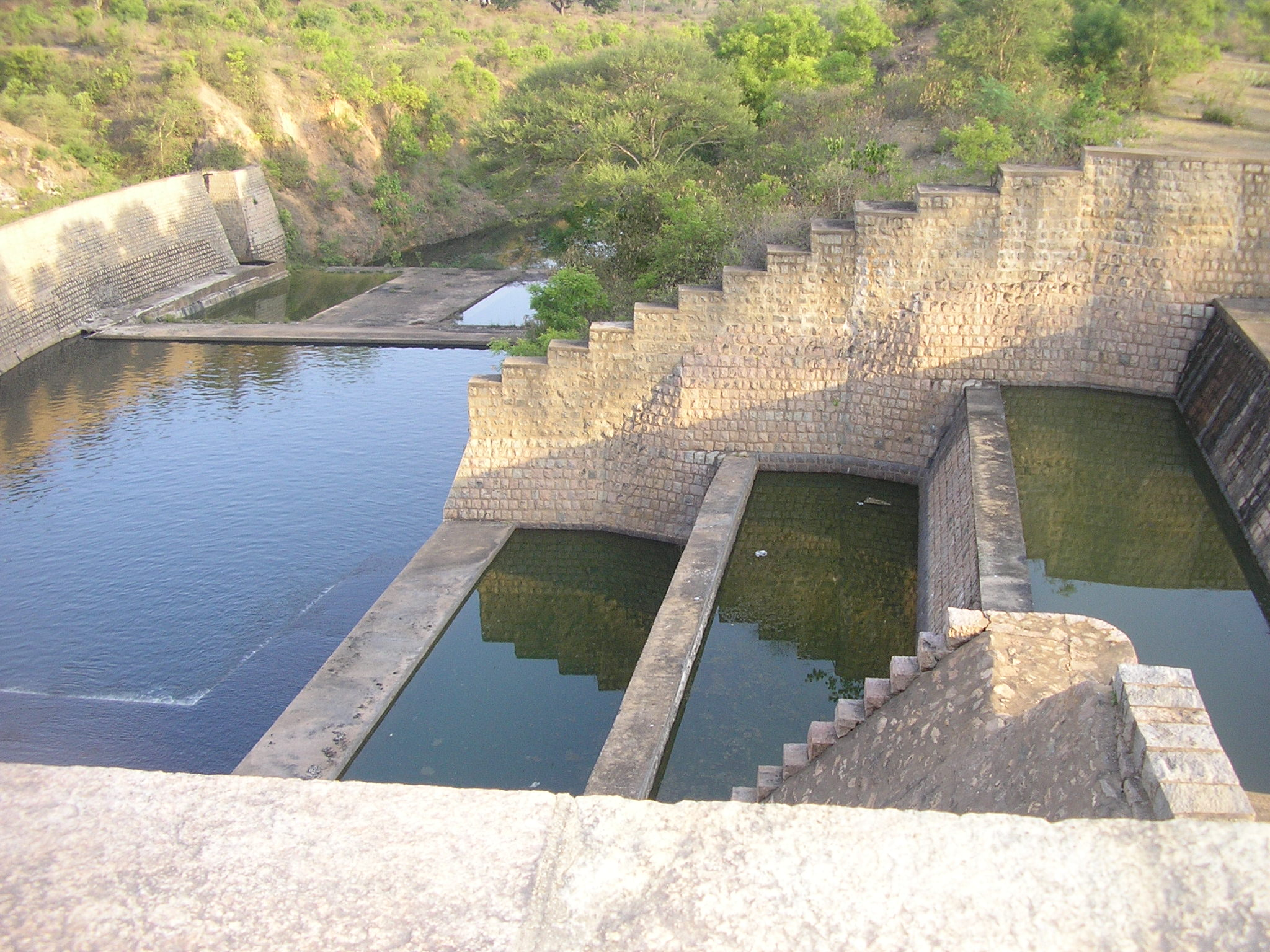
- Tippagondanahalli Reservoir

Location
- Country: India
- State: Karnataka
- District: Chikkaballapur, Bengaluru North, Bengaluru Urban, Bengaluru South

Physical characteristics
- Source: Nandi Hills
  - location: Chikkaballapur, Karnataka, India
  - coordinates: 13.368689°N 77.681335°E
  - elevation: 1,478 m (4,849 ft) approx.
- Mouth: Kaveri River
  - location: Sangama River Point, Ramanagara, India
  - coordinates: 12.287986°N 77.432141°E
  - elevation: 440 m (1,440 ft) approx.
- Length: 190 km (120 mi)approx.

Basin features
- Tributaries
  - left: Vrishabhavathi; Suvarnamukhi; Antharamukhi; Devamukhi
  - right: Kumudvathi

The Arkavathi is an important mountain river in Karnataka, India, originating at Nandi Hills of Chikkaballapura district. It is a tributary of the Kaveri, which it joins at 34 km south of Kanakapura, Bengaluru South district called Sangama in Kannada, after flowing through Ramanagara and Kanakapura.

The river drains into the Chikkarayappanahalli Lake near Kanivenarayanapura. Kumudavathi and Vrishabhavathi rivers are tributaries to this river. It forms Chunchi falls near Haroshivanahalli. It joins Kavery river as a tributary near Mekedatu.

== Course ==
The river originates in the Nandi Hills in the Chikkaballapura district and flows through Ramanagara and Kanakapura before it eventually drains into the Chikkarayappanahalli Lake near Kanivenarayanapura. Stretchinig 53 km from Nandi Hills to TG halli, the Arkavati joins the Kaveri river around 34 km south of Kanakapura in the Ramanagara District. The river has three tributaries; Kumudavathi River, Suvarnamukhi River, and Vrishabhavathi River.

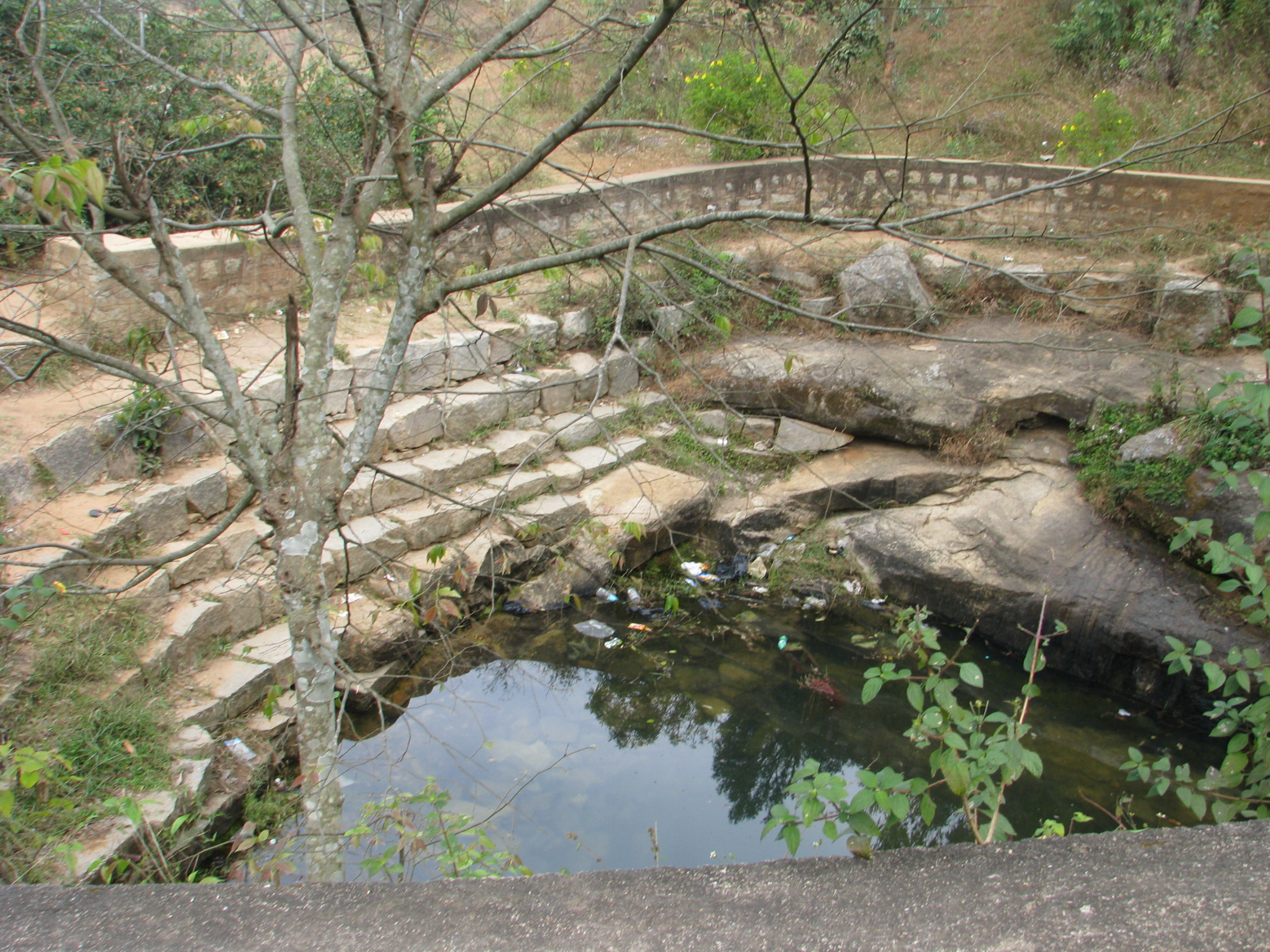
Source of Arkavathy River at Nandi Hills

== History ==
The river has historically been used as a source of drinking water in Banglore and the surrounding regions.

=== Kingdom of Mysore Period ===
In 1891, when Bangalore had a population of just 180,000 people, the then dewan of Mysore, K. Seshadri Iyer realized the lack of a dedicated water source for the city and took up the construction of the Chamarajendra Waterworks at Hesaraghatta across the river. The reservoir was designed to supply water for up to 250,000 people. By 1918, the population of the city had already reached 250,000 and the reservoir was running dry. The Sir M Visvesvaraya committee recommended the construction of Tippagondanahalli reservoir which was commissioned in 1933. The first stage was designed to provide a daily supply of 27 million liters per day (MLD) of water for a population of 300,000. However, even this was not enough and, so, modifications were made to cater to the population of one million in 1956. Eventually, the Chamaraja Sagar reservoir was insufficient and the government had to turn to the Kaveri to fulfill the water needs of Bangalore.

=== Decline in 1980s ===
It has been widely agreed upon that the destruction of the Arkavathi came about in the 1980s. This was a time when Bengaluru was urbanizing rapidly, which not only increased the demand for drinking water but also created scarcity for manual labor in the peripheral areas. As a result, the cost of labor went up. Added to this, the demand for firewood went up and as part of social forestry, the forest department distributed free eucalyptus seedlings to farmers. Eucalyptus is a water-intensive tree that uses up a large quantity of groundwater. This, in turn, reduced the groundwater levels in the catchment areas of the river and severely affected the water flow.

=== Efforts at Rejuvenation ===
In 2005, the Arkavathy-Kumudvati River Rejuvenation Committee was formed to rejuvenate the river. But there were no further steps taken except forming the committee. The Bangalore Water Supply and Sewerage Board (BWSSB) attempted to purify the river through aerator systems to increase dissolved oxygen and a series of plants that remove pollutants and also to reduce the inflow of sewage into T.G. Halli.

== See also ==
- Ponnaiyar River
- Palar River
- Vrishabhavathi River
- Hesaraghatta Lake
- Thippagondanahalli Reservoir
