= Thippagondanahalli Reservoir =

Reservoir west of Bangalore, India

Thippagondanahalli Dam
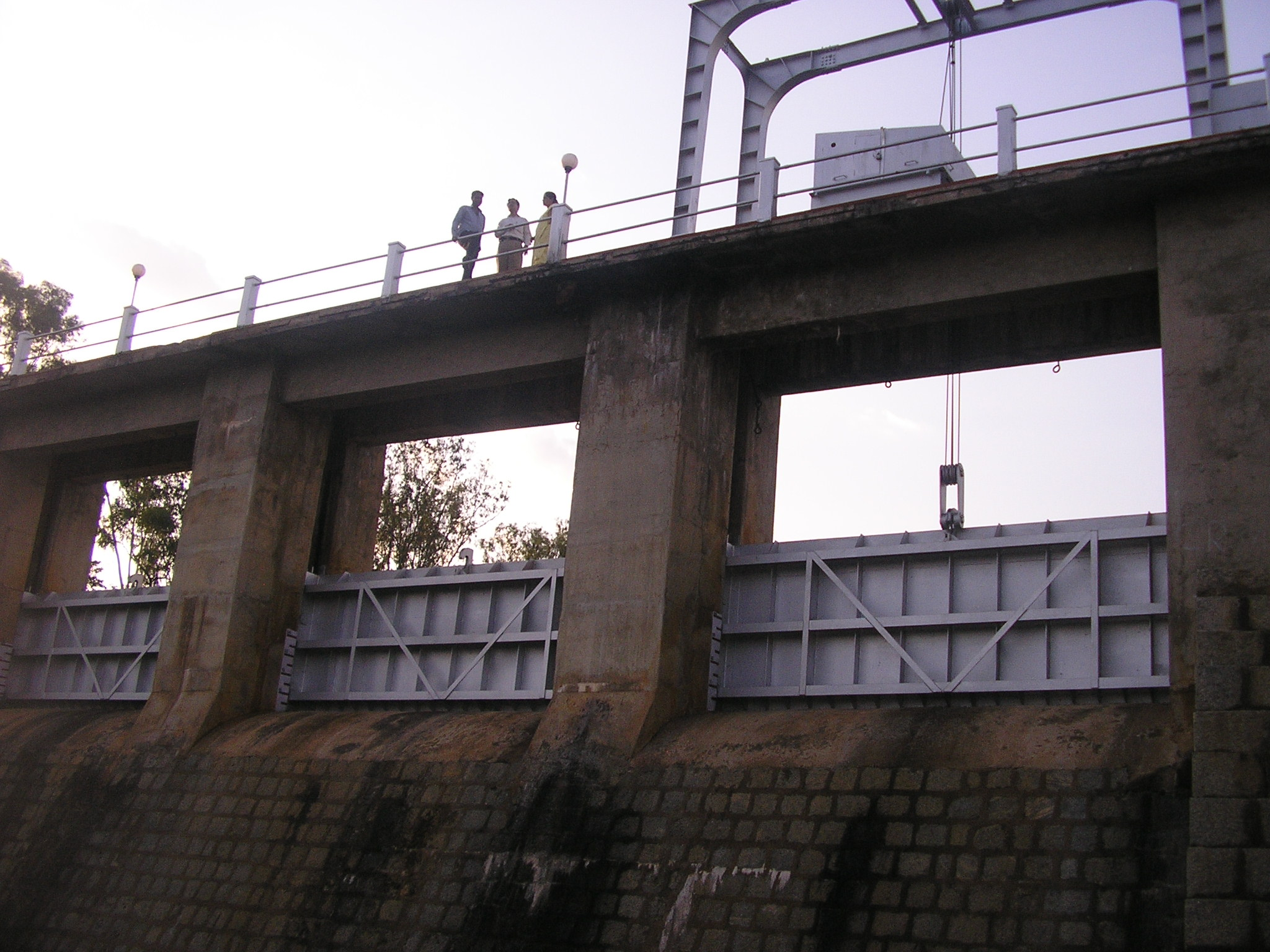
- Tippagondanahalli dam floodgates
- Interactive map of Thippagondanahalli Dam
- Country: India
- Location: 35 kilometres (22 mi) west of Bangalore
- Coordinates: 12°58′24″N 77°20′33″E

Thippagondanahalli Reservoir, also known as T G Halli Dam or Chamarajasagara, is located at the confluence of the Arkavathy and Kumudavathi rivers, 35 kilometres (22 mi) west of Bangalore, India. It is used by the Bangalore Water Supply and Sewerage Board as a major source of drinking water for western Bangalore. The lake is a man-made reservoir, created by the building of a dam which was inaugurated in 1933. M. Visvesvaraya supervised the construction work.

== Water crisis ==
In the summer of 2007, the lack of rain in the watershed for the reservoir, along with use of the water for the city ran the lake almost dry.

== Recreational use ==
Thippagondanahalli is also popular recreation location, especially during summer months. It is located on Magadi road. There is one more dam at Manchanabele in Arkavathy downstream.

== See also ==
- Dodda Alada Mara
- Lakes in Bangalore
- Savandurga
