= 1998 Malpa landslide =

Fatal landslide in Uttar Pradesh, India

- Date: 18 August 1998
- Location: Malpa village Pithoragarh district, Uttar Pradesh, India; 29.535°N 80.311°E
- Type: landslide
- Deaths: 221
- Injuries: unknown

The Malpa landslide was one of the worst landslides in India. On 18 August 1998 at 3.00 a.m., massive landslide wiped away the entire village of Malpa in the Pithoragarh district of Uttarakhand, then in Uttar Pradesh in Kali Valley of Higher Kumaon division of the Himalayas.

The rockfall started on 16 August bringing down huge rocks which initially killed three mules. A total of 221 people died, including 60 Hindu pilgrims travelling to Tibet as part of "Kailash Manas Sarovar Yatra". One noted death was that of the Indian dancer Protima Bedi. The rockfall continued till 21 August. As the area lies in a seismic zone, the earthquakes of 1979 and 1980 may have been the underlying cause, as was attributed by a report of the Wadia Institute of Himalayan Geology.

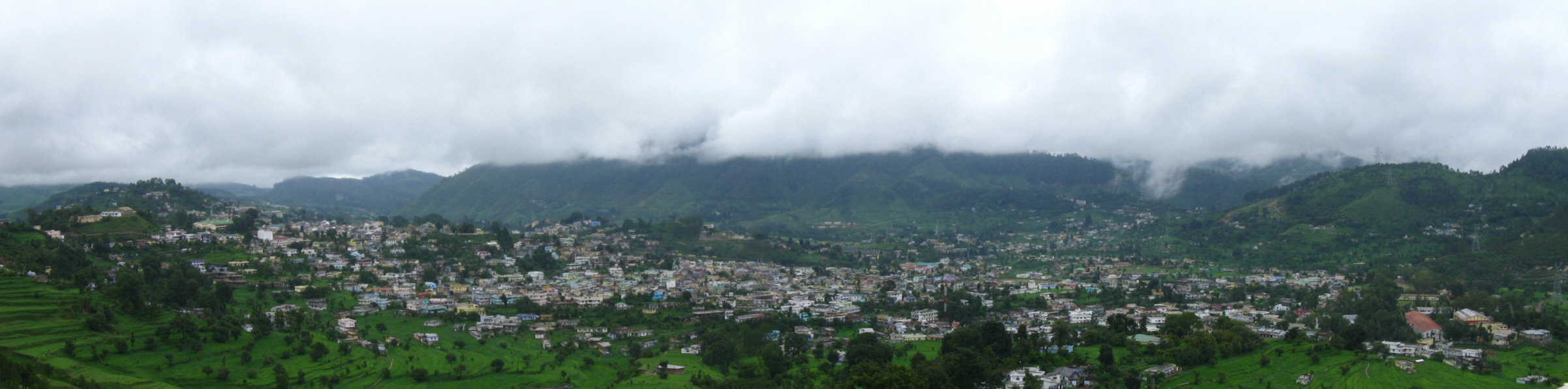
Pithoragarh valley Panoramic view

== Causes of landslide ==
The landslide generated around one million cubic meters of rock fall and debris flow. This debris partially blocked the Sharda River. The landslide prevailed mostly due to steep, almost vertical, slopes of rock above the valley. In addition to the slopes, the proximity of the rock mass to major tectonic plates, major rainfall into the porous rock, and stress on the rock formations all contributed to the landslide. Natural disasters in the area have been attributed to ″unplanned construction and urbanization on the fluvial and un-consolidated materials produced by active faults/thrusts in various sectors.″

The slide demonstrated the distressed state of rock in the Himalayan region because of the drift of the Indian plate northward.
