= Protima Bedi =

Indian model and Odissi exponent

- Born: Protima Gupta; 12 October 1948; Delhi, India
- Died: 18 August 1998 (aged 49); Malpa, Pithoragarh, India
- Occupations: Indian classical dancer; Model
- Spouse: Kabir Bedi (m. 1969; div. 1974)
- Children: 2, including Pooja Bedi
- Family: Alaya F (granddaughter)
- Website: nrityagram.org

Protima Gauri Bedi (12 October 1948 – 18 August 1998) was an Indian model who later became an Odissi dancer. In 1990, she initially founded Nrityagram, a dance school near Bangalore, Karnataka.

== Early life ==
Protima was born in Delhi on 12 October 1948, the second of four children, three daughters, and a son. Her father, Laxmichand Gupta, was a trader from a business Bania family in Karnal district, Haryana, and her mother, Reba, was of Bengali origin.

In 1953, her family moved to Goa. In 1957, they relocated to Mumbai. At the age of nine, she was sent to live with her aunt in a village in Karnal district, where she briefly attended a local school. Upon returning, she was enrolled at Kimmins High School in Panchgani, where she completed her early education. She later attended St. Xavier's College, Mumbai, from 1965 to 1967.

== Career ==
=== Modeling career ===
By the late 1960s, she had started working as a model. In 1974, she streaked during the daytime at Juhu Beach in Mumbai for the launch of the Bollywood magazine Cineblitz.

=== Dance career ===
You have only to ready yourself to allow things to happen as they should. The greatest favour you can do yourself is to 'get out of your own way'.
- Protima Bedi, Timepass: Memoirs of Protima Bedi

In August 1975, at the age of 26, her viewing of an Odissi dance recital inspired her to become a student of Guru Kelucharan Mohapatra. Under the Guru's tutelage, she learned to dance.

To improve her dancing skills, she started studying abhinaya from Guru Kalanidhi Narayanan of Madras. From then on, she began giving performances around the country. Around the same time, Protima started her dance school at Prithvi Theatre in Juhu, Mumbai. It later became the Odissi Dance Centre.

=== Nrityagram ===
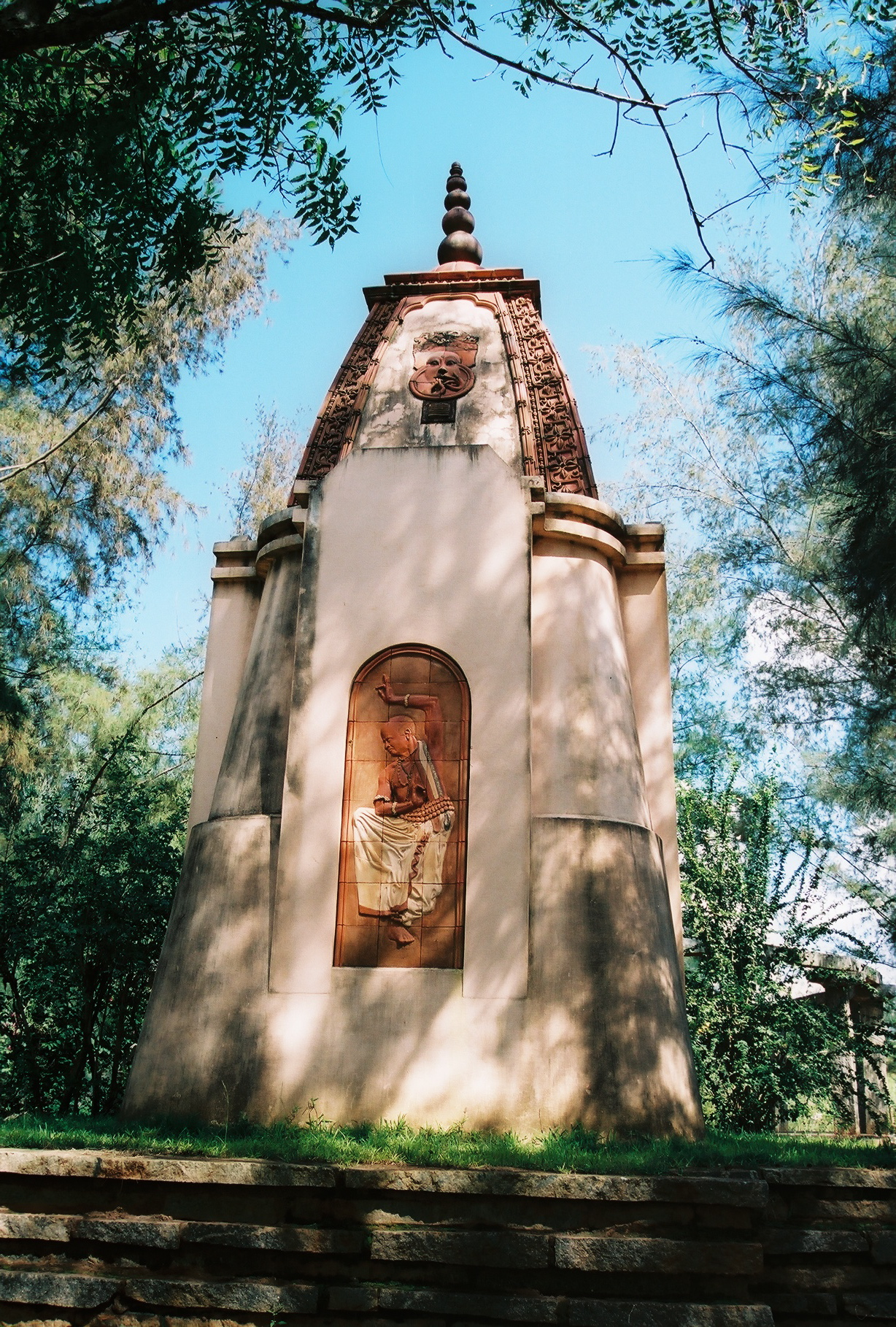
A temple dedicated to Kelucharan Mohapatra at Nrityagram Dance Community, near Bangalore, established by Protima Bedi.

In 1989, Protima started building Nrityagram, situated on the outskirts of Bangalore. It became India's first free dance gurukul village for various Indian classical dances, consisting of seven gurukuls for the seven classical dance styles and two martial arts forms, Chhau and Kalaripayattu. Nrityagram was inaugurated on 11 May 1990 by the then-Prime Minister, V.P. Singh. The dance school has a small community of Indian students learning Indian classical dance. Meanwhile, in 1992, Protima appeared in Pamela Rooks's English film, Miss Beatty's Children.

Nrityagram was designed by architect Gerard da Cunha. It won the Best Rural Architecture award in 1991. To raise funds to run Nrityagram, a tourist resort, Kuteeram was built in 1992. Nrityagram is also the venue of the annual dance festival Vasanta Habba, which first began in 1994 and attracted 40,000 visitors when it was last held in 2004. It was not held from 2005 to 2007 due to the aftermath of the 2004 tsunami and a shortage of funds.

=== Final years ===
Protima's son, Siddarth, suffered from schizophrenia and died by suicide in July 1997 while he was studying in North Carolina. This caused her to announce her retirement and change her name to Protima Gauri. Soon, she started traveling in the Himalayan region. In a newspaper interview given in April 1998, while camping at Rishikesh during the Kumbh Mela, she stated that she had decided to surrender herself to the Himalayas, expressing that it was the call of the mountains that had drawn her in and she also speculated about the outcome of this journey, believing that whatever lay ahead was certain to be something positive. Subsequently, in August 1998, Protima Gauri set off on her pilgrimage to Kailash Mansarovar. She died in the Malpa landslide, near Pithoragarh. Her remains and belongings were recovered after several days, along with seven other bodies found in the landslide.

The book Timepass is derived from Protima's journals and letters, compiled and published by her daughter, Pooja Bedi, in 1999. It gives an account of Protima's relationships and lifestyle, the birth of her dream project, Nrityagram, and her eventual transition into a sanyasin towards the end of her life, when she retired from public life and wanted to explore the Himalayas.

== Personal life ==
Protima met Kabir Bedi during her modelling career. After a few months, she left her parents' house to live with him. She married Kabir and had two children, including Pooja Bedi. They separated in 1974.

== See also ==
- Indian women in dance
