= List of tourist attractions in Bengaluru =

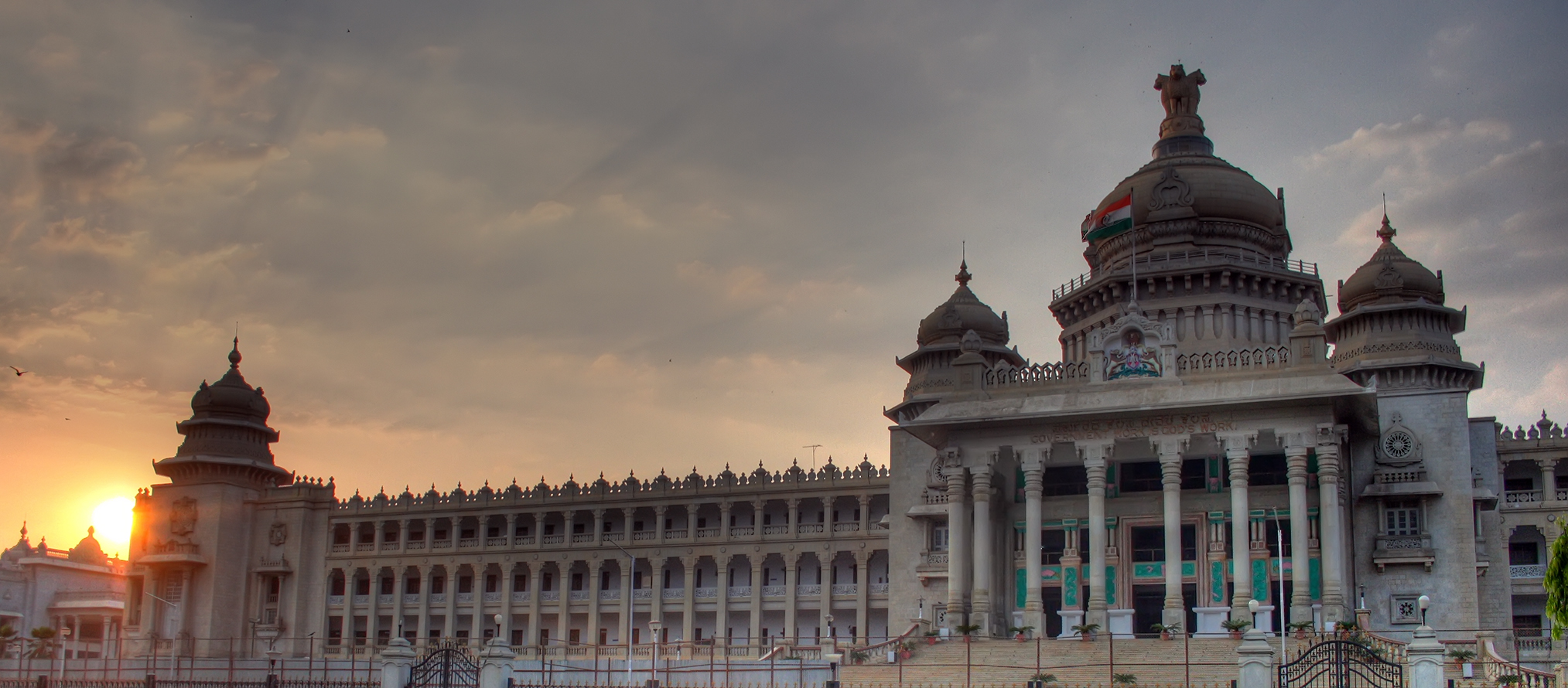
The Vidhana Soudha is the seat of Karnataka's Legislative assembly

Bengaluru is the capital of the Indian state Karnataka. The city was known as the "Garden City of India". Bengaluru is one of the most important tourist centers of Karnataka state.

== Attractions ==
=== Parks ===
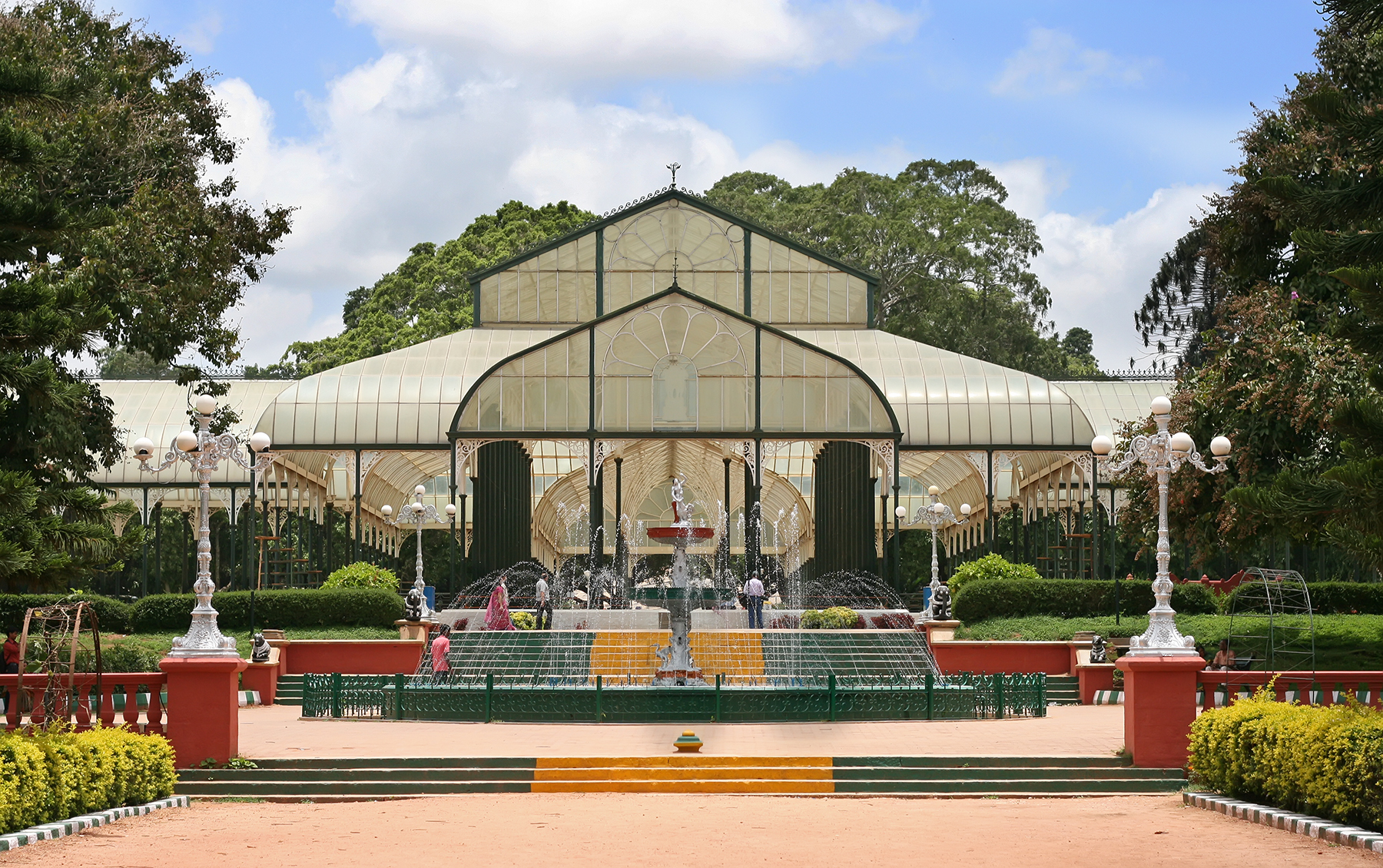
The Lal Bagh, famous for its flower shows was commissioned in 1760.

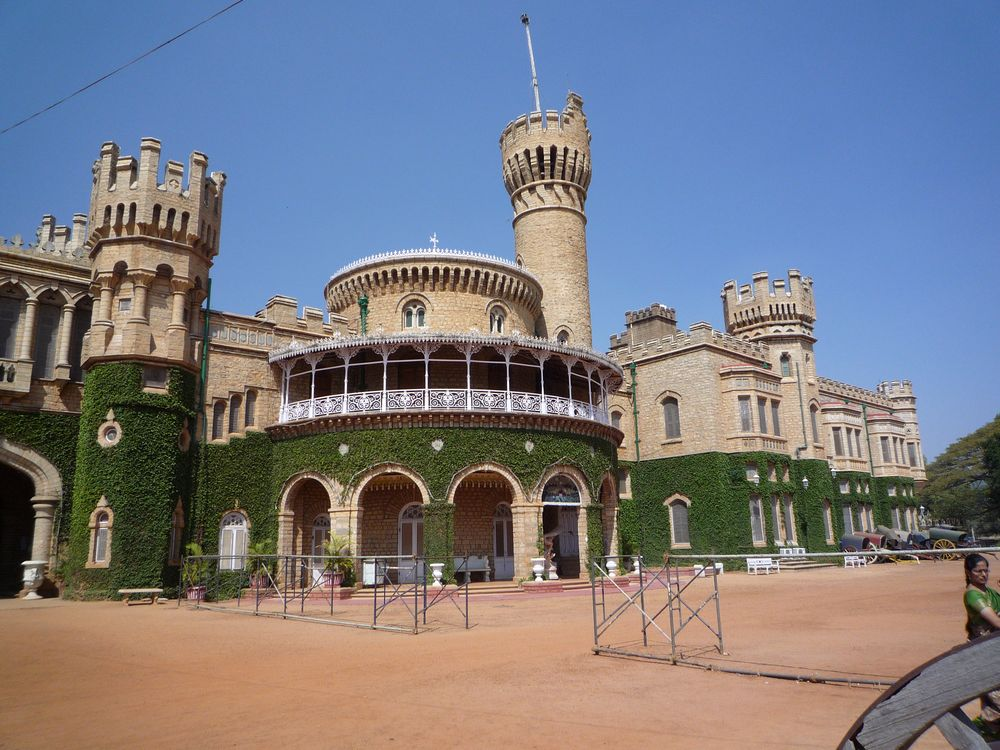
Bangalore palace

- Lal Bagh is a botanical garden, commissioned by the Hyder Ali in 1760. The 240-acre (0.97 km^{2}) park is home to over 1000 species of flora and a Glass House. The park is known for its annual flower show. The garden surrounds one of the towers erected by the founder of Bangalore, Kempe Gowda I. The Lal Bagh Rock, dates back to 3000 million years, is another attraction.
- Cubbon Park is located in the heart of the city and spreads over 300 acres (1.2 km2). The park was created in 1884, by Major General Richard Sankey. The park is home to numerous trees and plants that span over 68 general and 96 species. The park is also known for its kids train.
- Jayaprakash Narayan Biodiversity Park (JP park) is on an 85-acre (340,000 m2) site at Mathikere in the north-west area of Bangalore. The park has four lakes, lawns spread over 25 acres (100,000 m2), over 250 varieties of trees and shrubs can be found there all the time.

=== Historical monuments ===
- Bangalore Fort originally built by Kempegowda in 1537 A D. It is located next to the Victoria Hospital Gate in the K.R Market area. The original mudfort was replaced by a stone fort in 1761 by Mysuru ruler Hyder Ali.
- Tipu Sultan's Summer Palace was built in 1791, is a two-storied ornate wooden structure with exquisitely carved pillars, arches and balconies. It houses a museum that contains artifacts relating to the Hyder-Tipu regime.
- Bengaluru Palace (1862) is located near Mekhri Circle and Cantonment Railway station and is built to look like a smaller replica of the Windsor Castle in England.
- Mayo Hall was designed in memory of the Lord Mayo and is regarded as one of the finest designs of British architecture.
- Kempe Gowda Watch towers were built by Immadi Kempegowda (Kempe Gowda II) in the 16th century to watch over the boundaries of the city. The four watch towers Mehkri Circle tower, Halasuru Rock tower, Lalbagh rock tower and Kempambudhi Hillock tower. These towers feature symbolically in the icon of the Bengaluru's Municipal Corporation BBMP.

=== War memorials ===
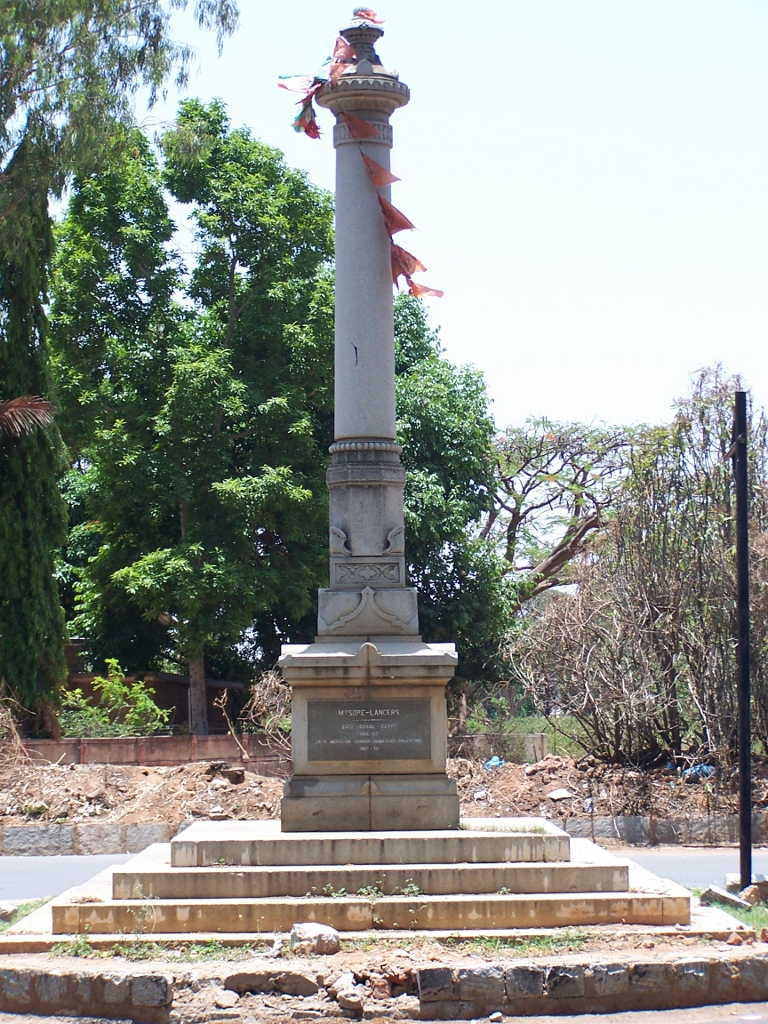
Mysore Lancers World War I memorial. The Lancers helped liberate Haifa (Israel) on Sep 23, 1918.

- World War I memorial (Sapper War Memorial): It is located at the intersection of Brigade Road and Residency Road. It was raised in honour the fallen of the Madras Sappers & Miners (Madras Engineer Group).
- Mysore Lancers WW-I memorial: A war memorial was erected at JC Road in memory of the contributions of the Mysore Lancers in World War I. The Mysore lancers were involved in the campaigns of the Suez Canal, Gaza, Meggiodo, Sharon, Damascus and Palestine. On September 23, 1918, the Mysore Lancers along with the Jodhpur lancers helped capture Haifa in modern-day Israel from Ottoman control.
- National Military Memorial located near the Jawaharlal Nehru Planetarium was constructed to honour the sacrifices of Indian soldiers over the years.

=== Government buildings ===
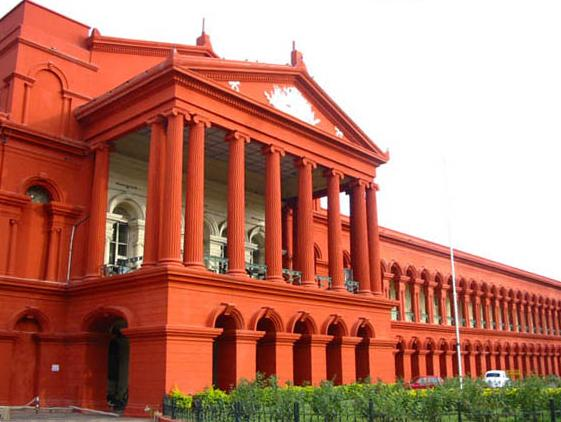
Attara Kacheri (Karnataka High Court)

- Vidhana Soudha is the seat of the state legislature of Karnataka. It is an imposing granite building, built in 1956 in the 'Neo-Dravidian' style, incorporates elements of Indo-Saracenic, Rajasthani Jharokha and Dravidian styles. Vidhana Soudha is the brainchild of Kengal Hanumanthaiah and built by chief engineer B.R. Manickam.
- Attara Kacheri, (Karnataka High Court), overlooks Vidhana Sabha. It is a red brick and stone building in the Greco-Roman style of architecture. It houses the High Court for the state of Karnataka.

=== Museums ===
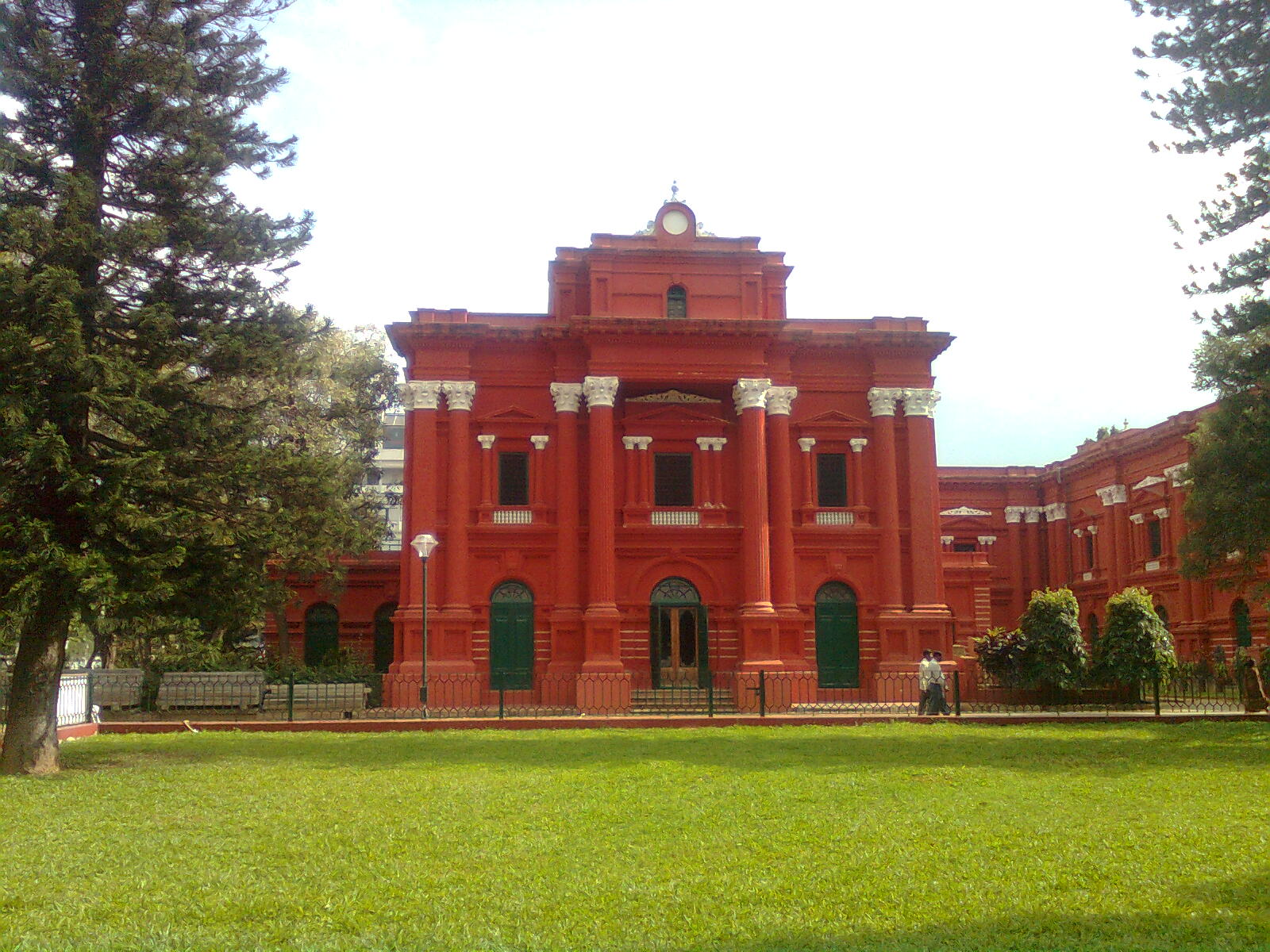
Government Museum, Bangalore established in 1865

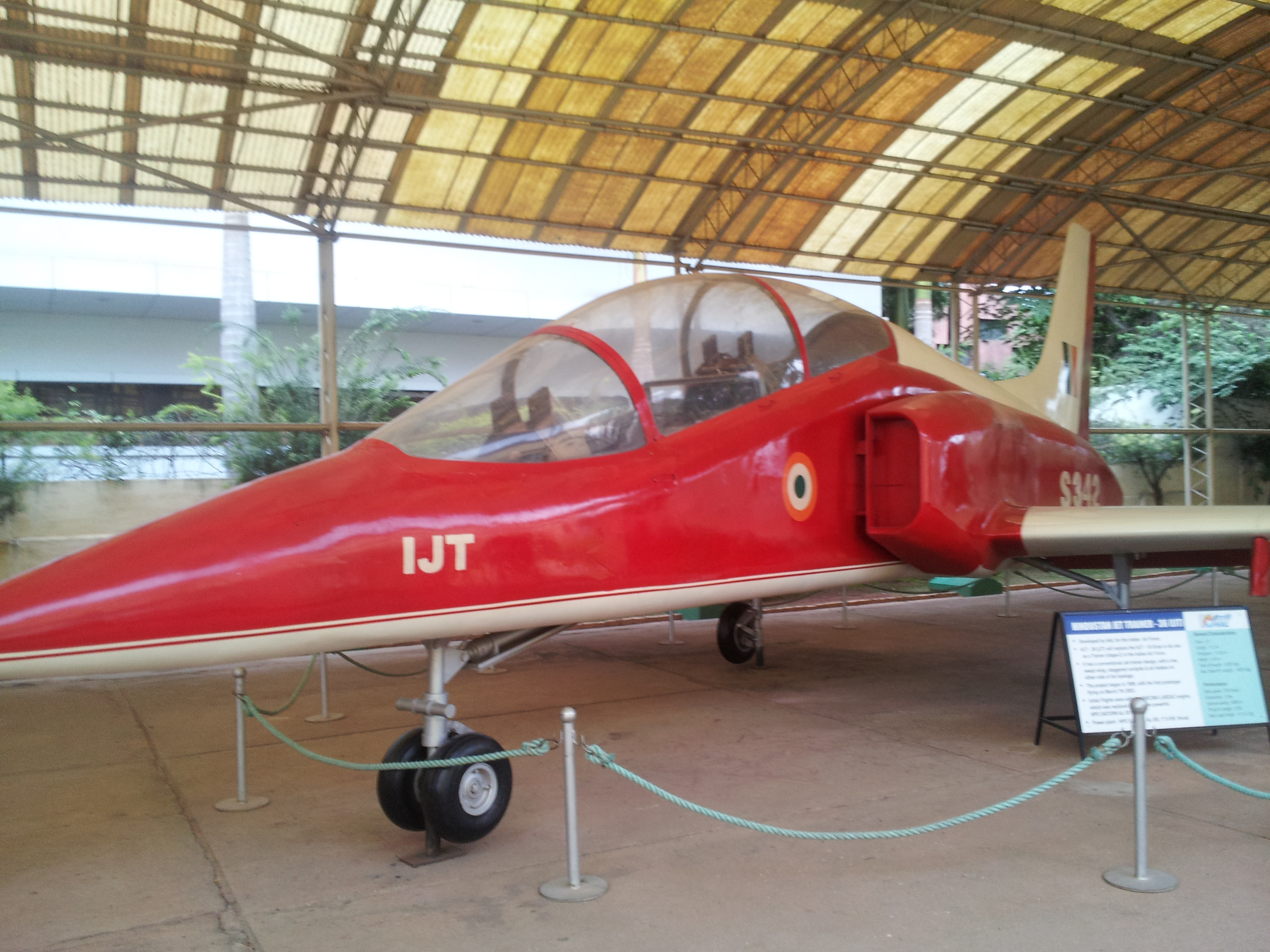
The HAL Kiran on display at the HAL Aerospace Museum. It showcases six decades of aviation heritage.

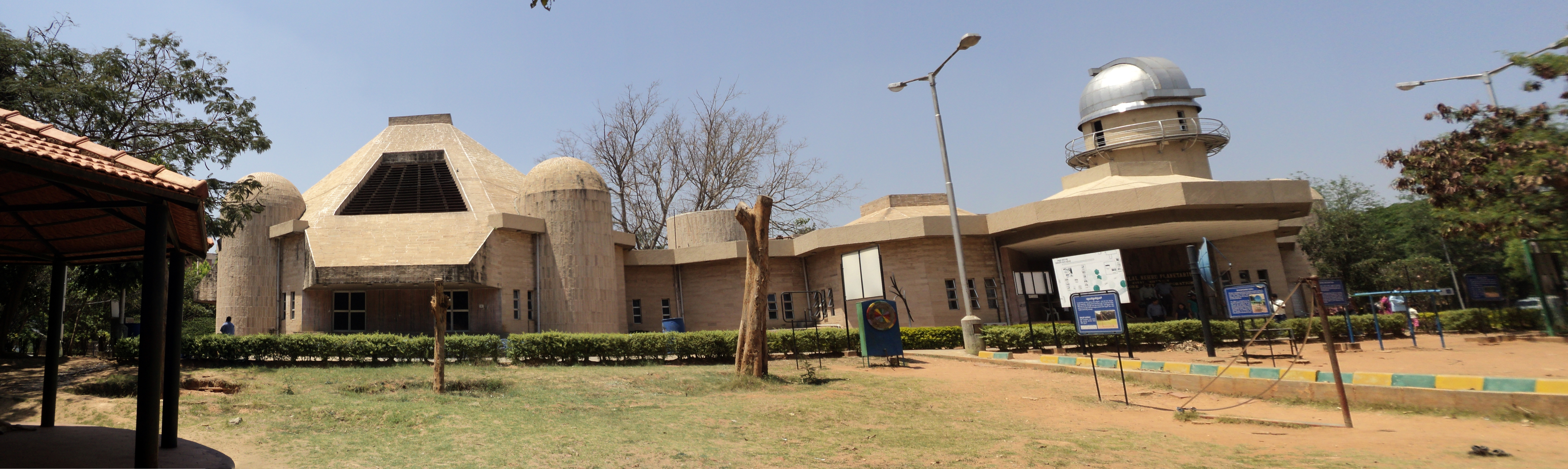
The Jawaharlal Nehru Planetarium, Bangalore

- Government Museum was established in 1865 has a rare collection of archaeological and geological artifacts including old jewellery, sculpture, coins and inscriptions. The museum is also home to the Halmidi inscription, the earliest Kannada inscription ever found (450 AD).
- Kempegowda Museum is dedicated to Yelahanka chieftain Kempegowda (1513–1569) who is the founder of Bangalore city. The museum is located on the first floor of Mayo Hall. The museum has Kempegowda's statue as well as posters and pictures of forts, temples, reservoirs and inscriptions from his time.
- Visvesvaraya Industrial and Technological Museum was instituted as part of the centenary celebrations of the engineer-statesman Sir M. Visvesvaraya (1861–1962) at Kasturba Road.
- HAL Aerospace Museum showcases the growth of the Indian aviation industry and HAL for six decades. The museum is maintained by HAL (one of Asia's largest Aerospace companies). The museum houses displays of various aircraft and helicopters, Aircraft engine models, Flight simulators, a mock Air Traffic Control Tower and exhibit of Indian aviation history.
- The Madras Sappers Museum & Archives, inaugurated in 1979, showcases the history of the Madras Engineer Group (called the Sappers, established in 1803). The Madras Sappers are the oldest regiment of the Corps of Engineers of the Indian Army. The museum chronicles their history and achievements and houses armoury used by the regiment, medals, their attire and a sports gallery.
- NIMHANS Brain Museum showcases the human brain and its functions. It is located in the Wilson garden area. The museum has a diverse collection of over 600 brain samples and is the result of over 30 years of research. The museum seeks to help visitors understand how the brain works and get an insight into the kind of diseases that can affect it.
- Philatelic Museum is located at the first floor of the Bangalore General Post Office near Vidhana Soudha.
- Karnataka Folk Museum is located in a 15-acre campus at Kumara Park West has an excellent collection of Folk puppets, costumes, utensils, instruments, weapons and masks. folk music collections and dance videotapes.
- Gandhi Bhavan established in 1965 at Kumara Park is showcase of Mahatma Gandhi's life. It houses a photo gallery, his letters, a library and audio visuals.
- Law Museum is a museum (established in 2006) dedicated to the legal profession. It was the brainchild of Karnataka High Court Chief justice Cyriac Joseph. The museum houses an original print of the Constitution of India, articles and documents related to the legal profession, seals, insignia and books. It also showcases the history of the High Court and the development of courts over the ages.
- Museum of Art & Photography (MAP) is south India's first private art museum, showcasing the country's rich visual culture. The museum's collection includes modern and contemporary artworks, traditional paintings, photographs, sculptures, textiles, crafts, and more, ranging from the 10th century to the present.
- Legends Motorcycle Museum is a collection of 20 plus vintage motorcycles in working condition whose vintage dates back to 1924. The museum is the lifelong collection of motorcycle enthusiast SK Prabhu. The museum walls are covered with biker memorabilia and photographs. The collection includes a 1924 BSA 250 cc, a Cezeta 1962 and some rare motorcycles from World War II: the BSA M20 1942 500 cc, James ML 1942 and the Norton 500cc 1942.
- Jawaharlal Nehru Planetarium is one of the five Planetariums named after India's first prime minister. It was founded by Bangalore City Corporation in 1989.

=== Galleries ===
- National Gallery of Modern Art is an art gallery in Bangalore. It was inaugurated in the year 2009. It showcases modern Indian art and houses paintings by Raja Ravi Verma, Jamini Roy, Amrita Sher-Gil, Rabindranath Tagore and a large number of Modern and Contemporary artists. NGMA also organizes art walks.
- Karnataka Chitrakala Parishath, is an art gallery of high standards. It is home to traditional Mysore art, as well as European Art, mainly Russian.

=== Nature ===
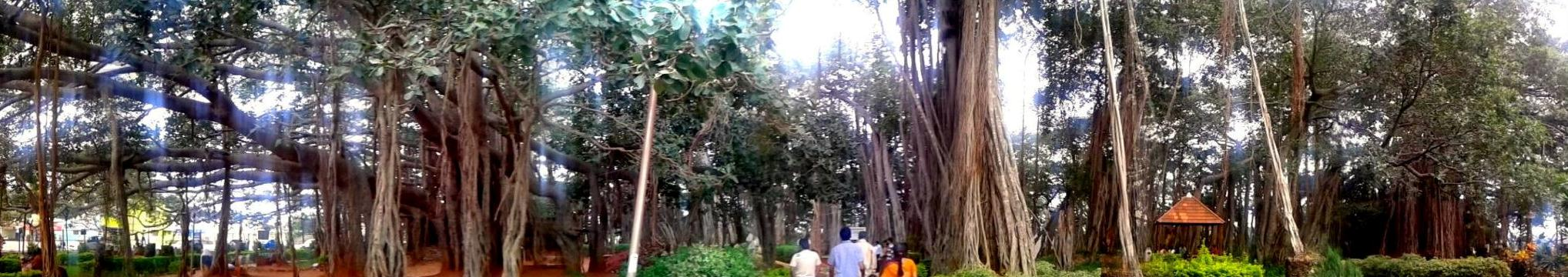
Big banyan tree is 400 years old and has a span of 3 acres

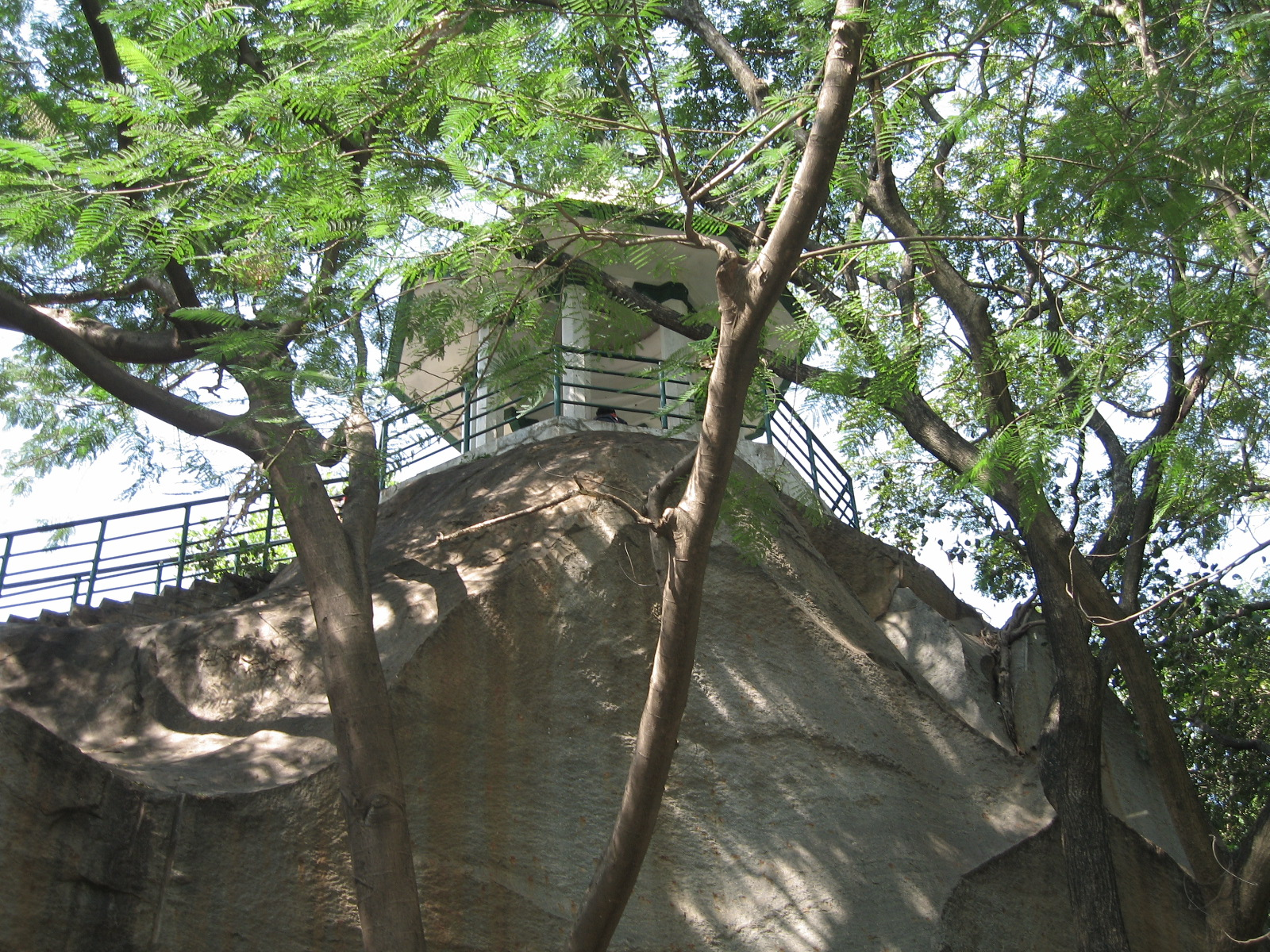
The watch tower on the Bugle Rock built by Kempegowda II

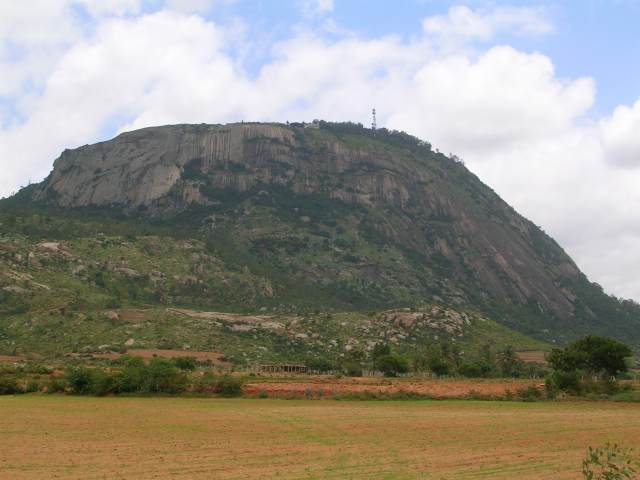
Nandi hills

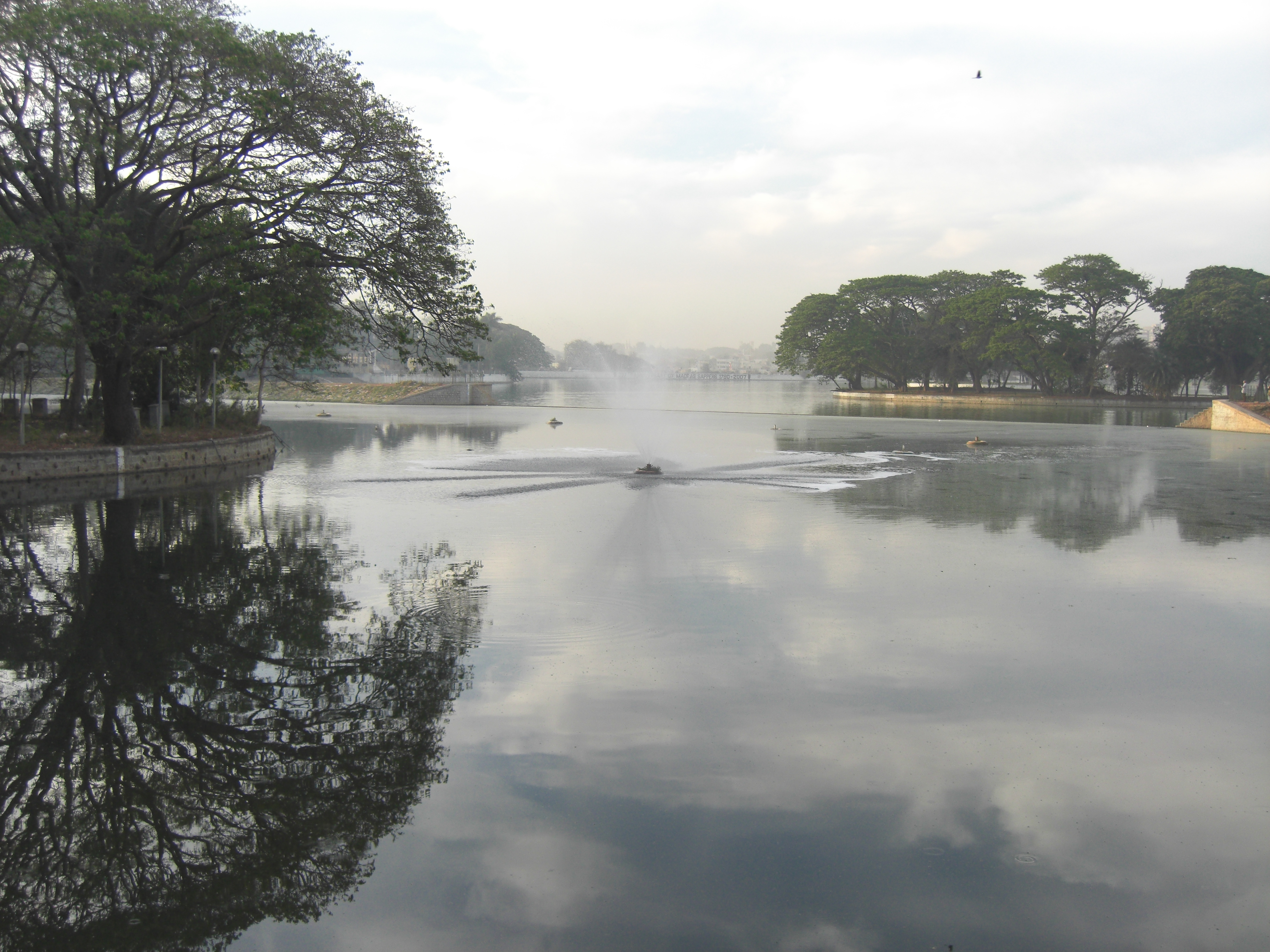
Ulsoor lake

White tiger at Bannerghatta National Park

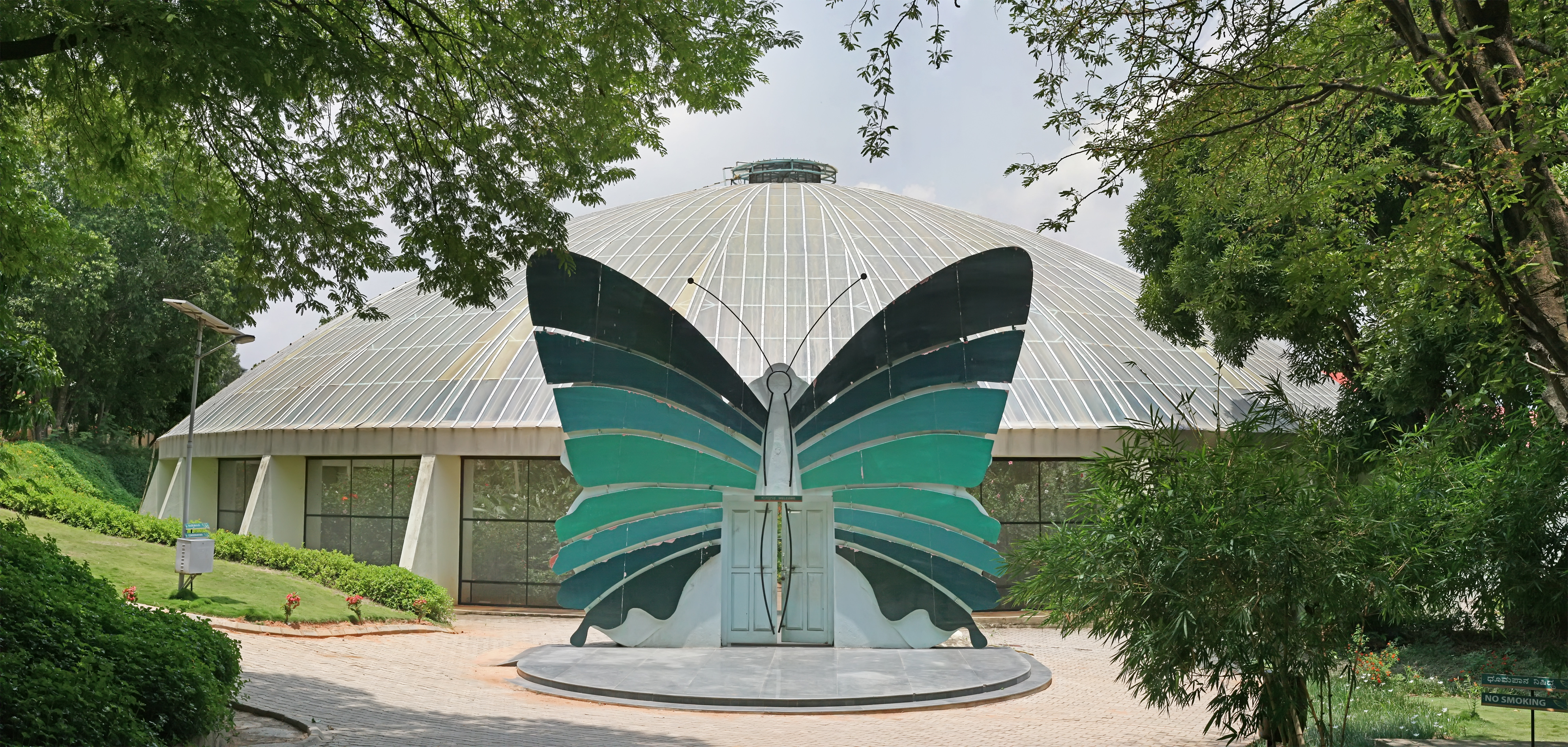
Butterfly Park

- Koravakunda: Koravakunda is a hill station, which is around 250 m high and 65 km from Bangalore. It's a beautiful short trek to enjoy with friends.
- Dodda Alada Mara, a big banyan tree located in Ramohalli (28 km away). This tree covers 3 acres (12,000 m2) and is one of the largest of its kind. It is at least 400 years old.
- Bugle Rock (called Kahale Bande (ಕಹಳೆ ಬ೦ಡೆ)) is a massive rock situated in Basavanagudi which is an abrupt rise above the ground of peninsular gneiss as the main rock formation and with an assessed age of about 3000 million years.
- Lakes in Bengaluru include Ulsoor Lake, DRDO Lake, Sankey tank, Hesaraghatta Lake, Yediyur Lake, Nagavara Lake (also called Lumbini Lake), Hebbal Lake, Madiwala Lake, Kempanbudi Lake, Varthur Lake, Bellandur Lake among others.
- Thottikallu is a place 25 km from Bangalore off the Kanakapura road which is famous for a falls called Thottikallu falls more popularly known as TK falls.
- Tippagondanahalli Reservoir, also known as T G Halli or Chamarajsagar, is located at the confluence of the Arkavathy River and Kumudvathi River, 35 km west of Bangalore.
- Nandi Hills or Nandidurg is a hill fortress of southern India, in the Chikkaballapur district of Karnataka state. It is located just 3 to 5 km from Chickballapur Taluq, 60 km from Bangalore. It is 4851 ft (1478 m) above sea level. Nandidurg hill, known commonly as Nandi Hills, is the source of the Penner, Ponnaiyar and Palar rivers. Nandi Hills gets its name from an ancient Nandi temple situated on this hill. This temple has a thousand year old sculpture of Nandi. An ancient lord Shiva and Parvati temple also adorns this hill.
- Kaivara, cave temples 60 km away near Chikkaballapur.
- Makalidurga - is a great place near Doddaballapura, around 60 km from Bangalore which offers a great opportunity to trek and enjoy the surroundings.
- Savandurga is a hill 60 km west of Bangalore off the Magadi road. The hill is famous for Narasimhaswamy temple and is also believed to be among the largest monolith hills in Asia. The hill rises to 1226 m above mean sea level and forms a part of the Deccan plateau. It consists of peninsular gneiss, granites, basic dykes and laterites. The Arkavathi river passes nearby through the Thippagondanahalli Reservoir and on towards Manchanabele dam(feverpitch basecamp-located in banks of manchanabele dam). It is ideal for trekking. The peak offers a great view of the surrounding landscape.
- Fever Pitch Basecamp near Savandurga is a camping destination with woodsball, all terrain vehicle rides, kayaking, canoeing, swimming in natural waters, Rappelling, Zipline across terrain and jungle camping in Tents with sleeping bags and campfires.

=== Wildlife ===
- Bannerghatta National Park is situated 22 km south of Bangalore. This hilly place is the home for one of the richest natural, zoological reserves. The 25,000 hectares (101 km^{2}) zoological park makes this a major tourist attraction of Bangalore, which is very crowded during weekends and holidays.
- Butterfly Park is spread across 7.5 acres (30,000 m^{2}) of land. It comprises a butterfly conservatory, museum and an audio-visual room. The butterfly conservatory has a polycarbonate roof and is a 10,000 sq ft (1,000 m^{2}). circular enclosure, inside which the living environment has been carefully designed to support over 20 species of butterflies. The environment has a tropical setting — complete with the humid climate, an artificial waterfall, a narrow walking bridge and host plants and shrubs that attract butterflies.
- Birds at Hebbal lake - The habitat at Hebbal Lake is favoured by many species of water birds including large waterbirds such as the spot-billed pelican, Eurasian spoonbill, shoveller, pintail, garganey, little grebe, coot and the Indian spot-billed duck. The shallow zone supports sandpipers and other waders as well as purple moorhens, purple herons and grey herons. Nearly 350 species of birds have been recorded from the Bangalore region of which around 60 species may be seen with ease. Bangalore has an active bird watching club that meets every Sunday.
- Bengaluru Aquarium is the second largest aquarium in India. It is located at the entrance of Cubbon Park in Bengaluru, India, and was established in 1983. It has a variety of exotic cultivable as well as ornamental fish on display.

=== Amusement parks ===
- Lumbini Gardens was a public park on the banks of the Nagawara Lake near Hennur. It contained an eco-friendly boating park and a 12,500 square foot artificial beach and children's pool. The park ceased operations in December 2019, as the Forest Department of Karnataka declined to renew the lease between these parties on the grounds that the operators have polluted the lake.
- Wonderla is an amusement park located near Bidadi, 28 kilometers from Bangalore.

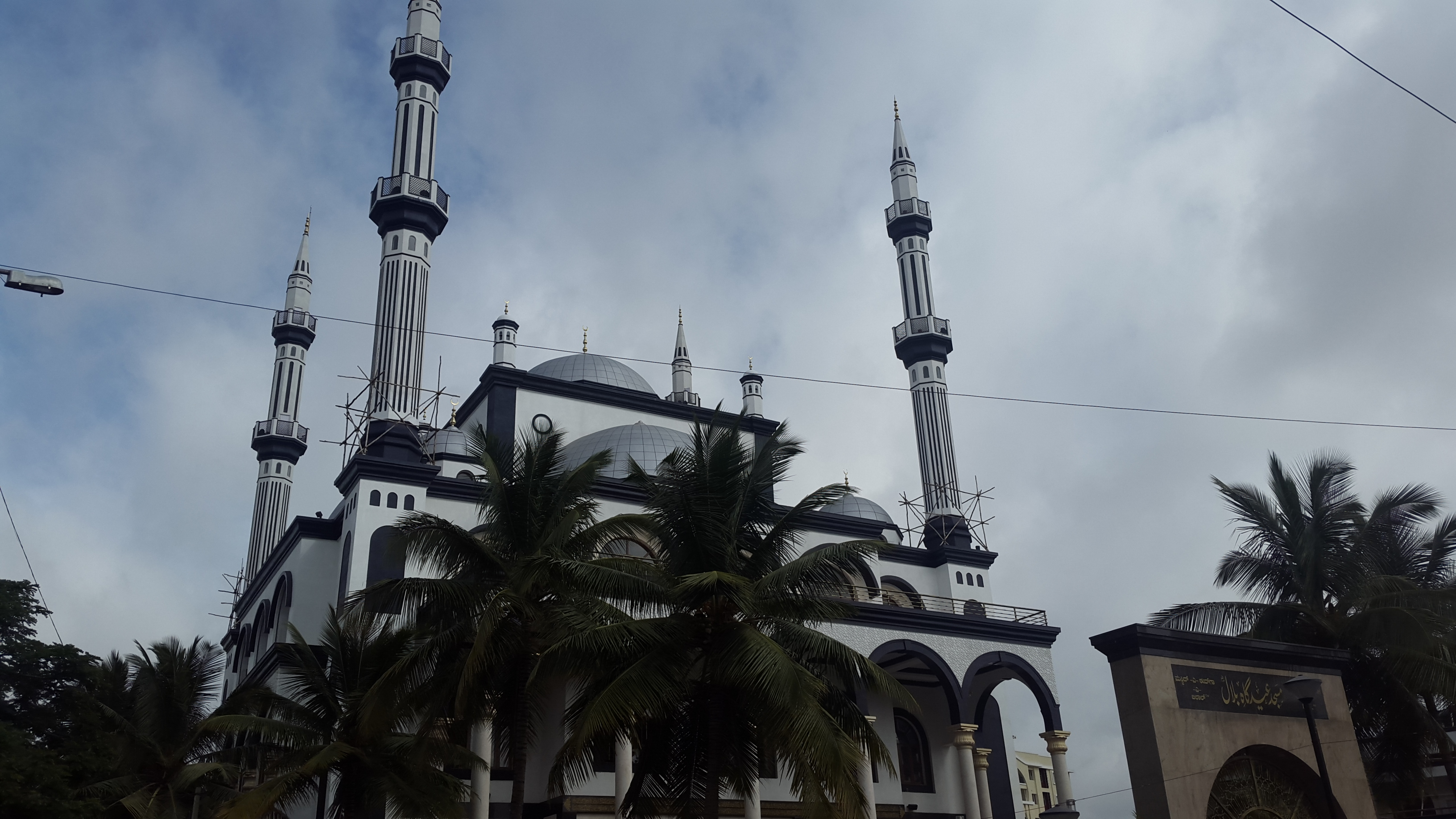
Masjid-e-Bilal

=== Places of worship ===
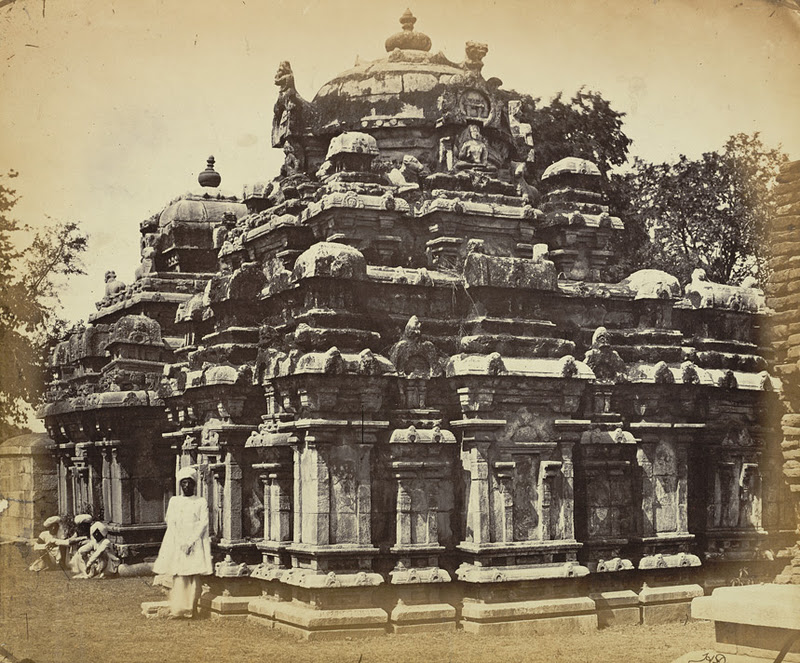
Nageshvara Temple, Begur: The oldest temple in Bengaluru. Built by the Western Ganga dynasty.

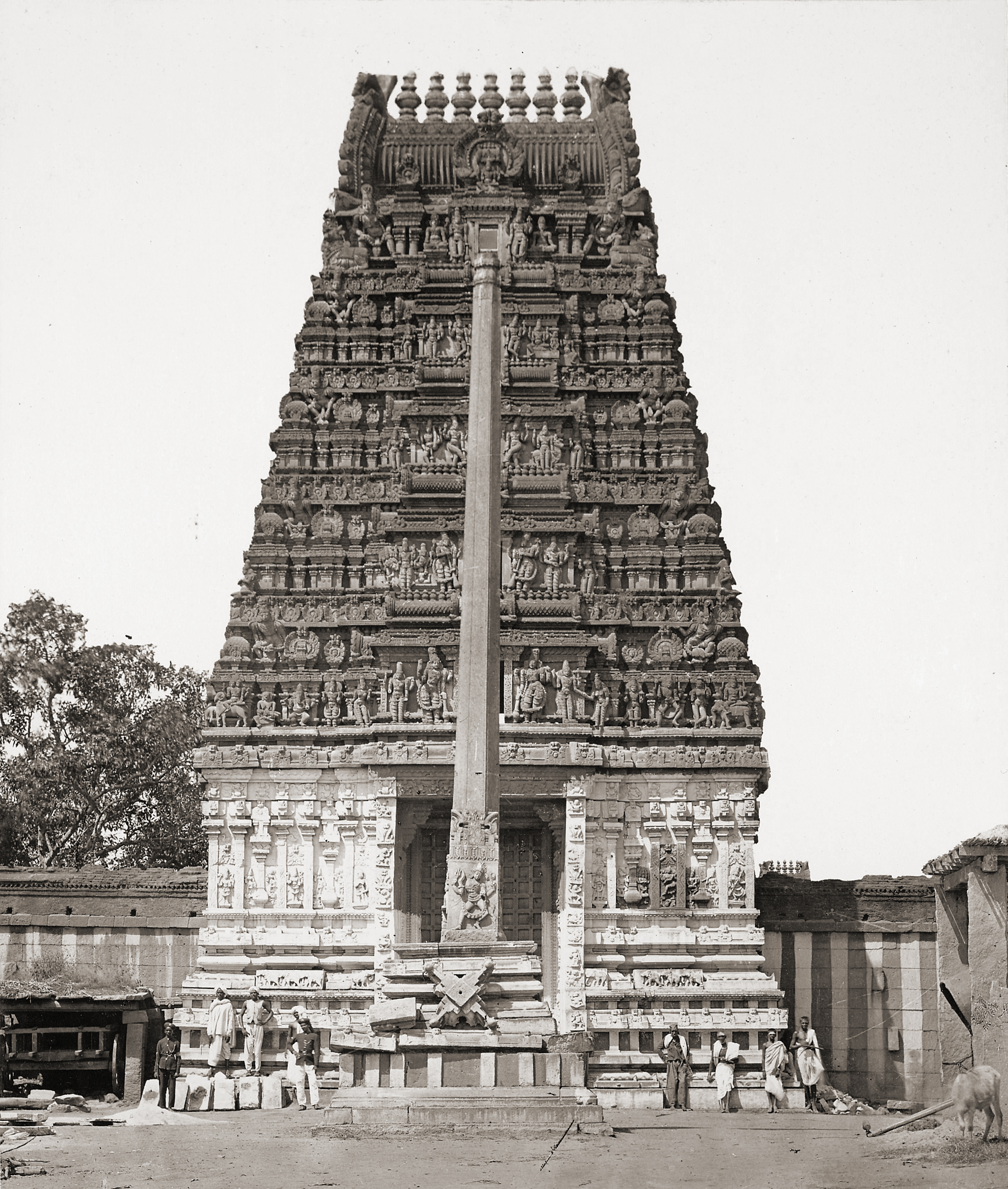
Someshwara Temple.

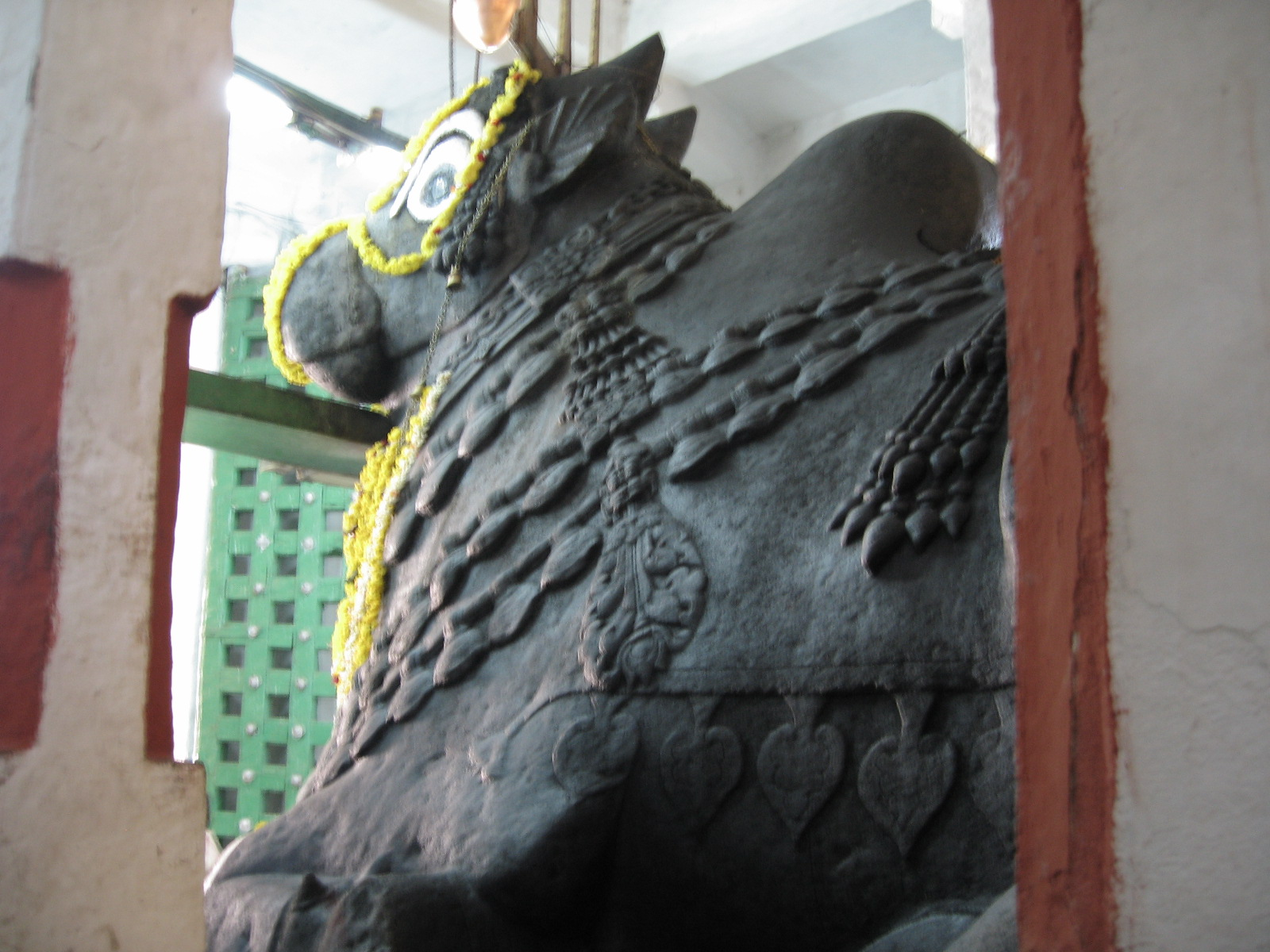
Bull Temple: One of the biggest Nandi idols in the world.

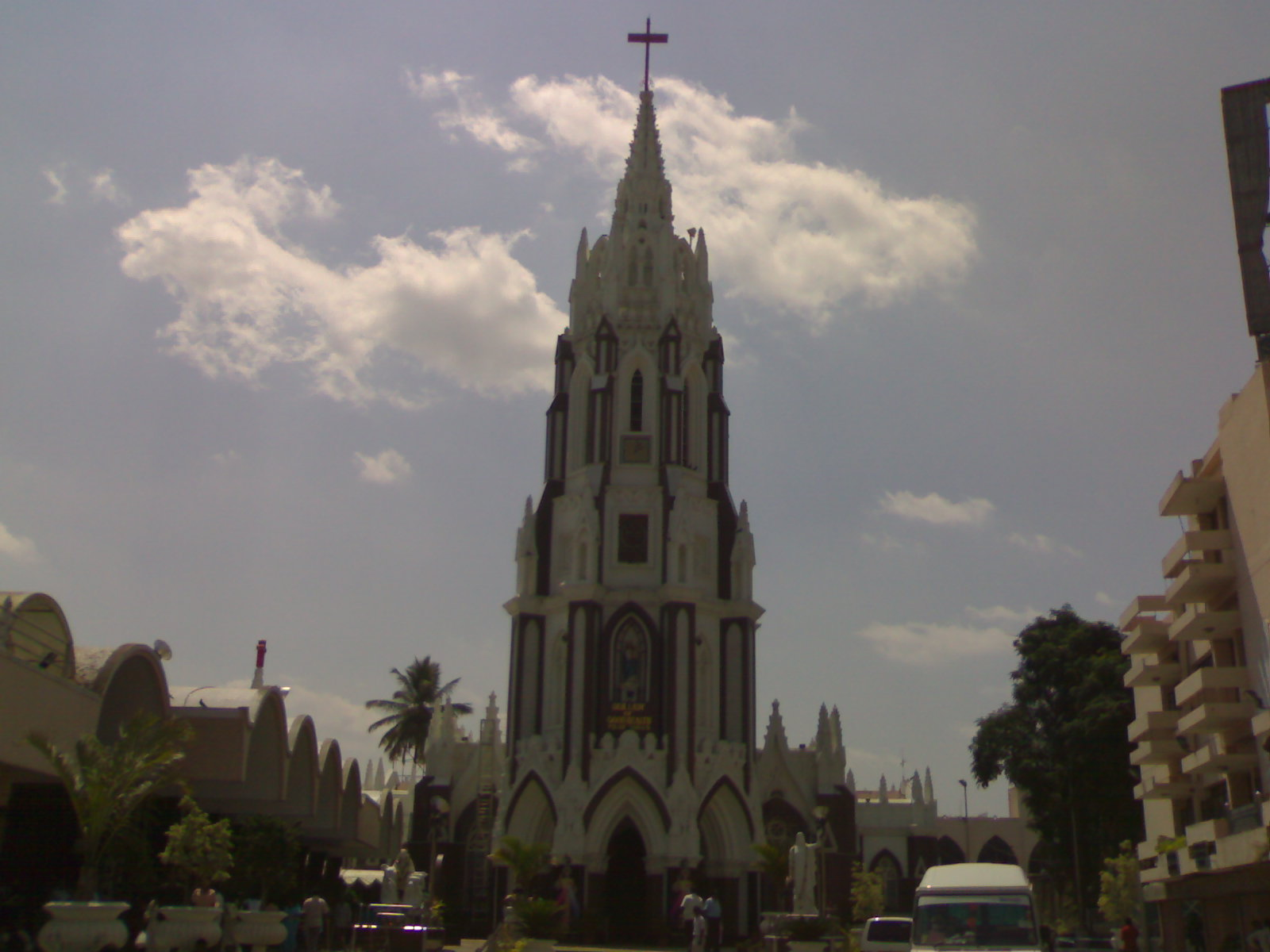
St. Mary's Basilica: A minor basilica famous for the St. Mary's feast held in September.

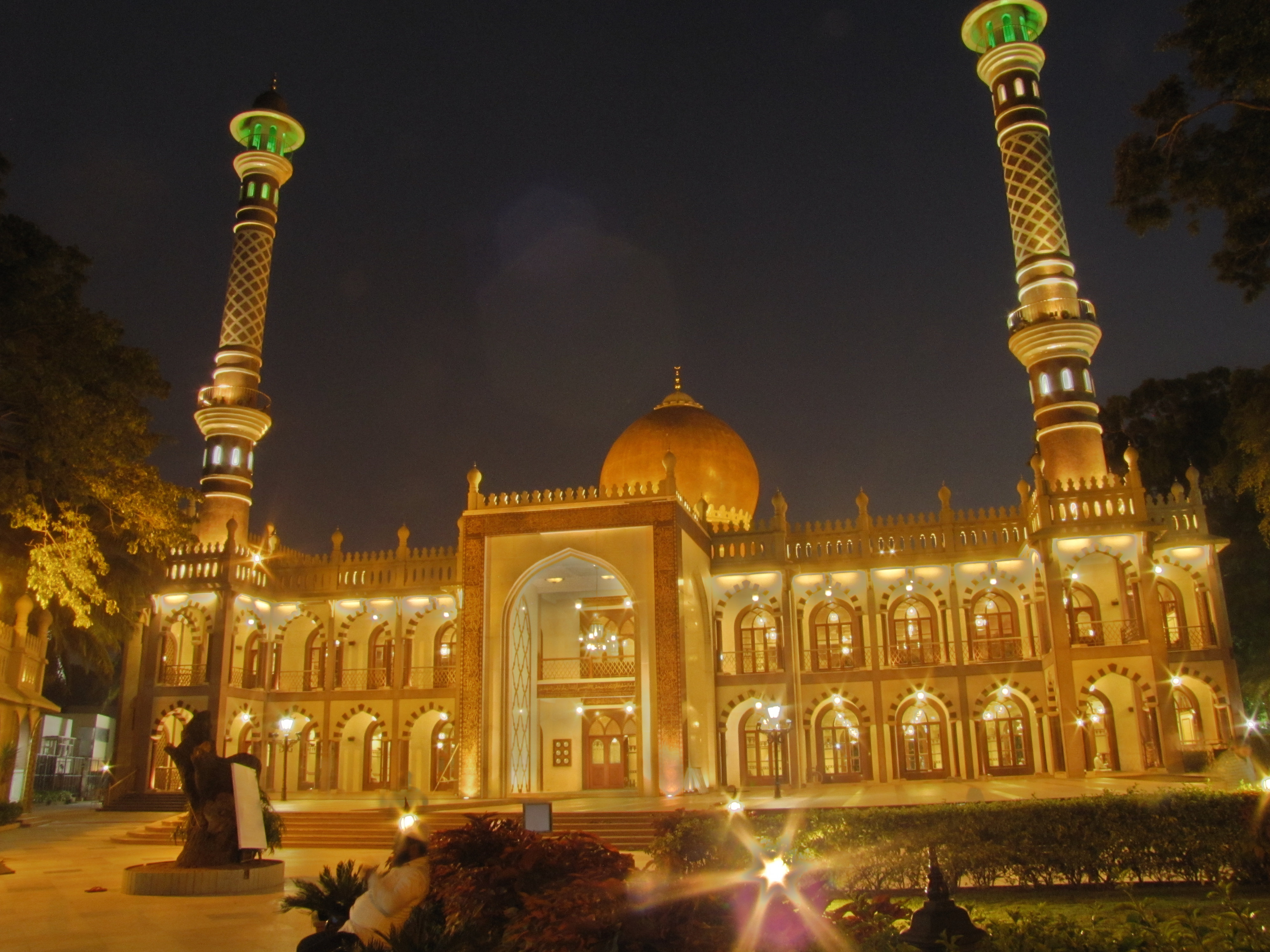
Masjid-e-Khadariya

- Nageshvara Temple, Begur is a ninth century temple built by the Western Ganga dynasty. The temple is also known for its Old Kannada inscription (dated c. 890) that forms the earliest reference to Bangalore by its name.
- Dharmaraya Swamy Temple located in OTC Road, Tigalarapet is famous for the annual Karaga festival that is 800 years old.
- Ranganathaswamy temple a 16th-century temple built by the Vijayanagara empire, located off Avenue Road.
- Halasuru Someshwara Temple a 16th-century temple located in Ulsoor built by the founder of Bangalore, Kempegowda in Dravidian style.
- Gavi Gangadhareshwara Temple is a 16th-century temple known as Dakshina Kashi. The sun's rays fall on the Shivalinga only on the day of Makara Sankranthi.
- Bull Temple was built by Kempe Gowda I. It is reminiscent of the 16th-century Dravidian-style architecture. It has a huge granite monolith of Nandi. This landmark is situated at bull temple road, Basavangudi.
- Kote Venkataramana Temple a 17th-century temple located the old fort area next to tippu's palace in Chamrajpet. The temple has beautiful granite sculptures.
- Kadu Malleshwara Temple is a 17th-century temple built by Shahji Bhonsle the father of Shivaji located in the locality of Malleshwaram off Sampige Road. The temple kalyani is said to be the source of the Vrishabhavati River.
- Kote Jalakantheshwara temple the a 400-year-old Shiva temple in Bangalore situated in Kalasipalya.
- ISKCON temple (Rajajinagar), built in an ornate architectural style, the Krishna Temple is a blend of modern technology and spiritual harmony. The temple is a fusion of modern and traditional elements of architecture.
- ISKCON temple (Vaikunta hills) is the Krishna Lila Theme park located at Uttarahalli (accessible from Kanakapura road). It is spread over 8 acres of land atop a hill and is ISKCON's largest temple complex in the world.
- Huge Shiva in old Airport Road is a huge idol of Lord Shiva & Ganesha completely made of plaster of Paris.
- St. Mark's Cathedral, consecrated in 1816, is the oldest church in Bengaluru. It was the garrison church of the Madras Army of the East India Company. The cathedral also has memorial plaques for several British officers and for lives lost in the Moplah revolt.
- St. Andrew's Church, consecrated in 1866, is a Presbyterian church, located in Cubbon road. Built by engineers R. C. Dobbs and Major Sankey, the church has a 25 ft. stained glass above the altar created by Scottish artists Alex Ballantine and Gardiner. The pipe organ of the church is over 126 years old. It has 2 manuals, 14 stops and 700 pipes.
- St. Mary's Basilica, consecrated in 1882, is the only church in Karnataka that has been elevated to the status of a minor basilica. It is famous for the festivities held during the St. Mary's Feast in the month of September each year, an event that attracts a number of devotees from in and around Bangalore.
- Memorial Church and Christ Church are the two remaining "Original Anglican" churches in Bangalore City affiliated to the Traditional Anglican Communion in India. They are located at Whitefield (Outer Circle) and Basavanguddi respectively.
- Infant Jesus Church, established in 1979 by Rev. Dr. Lourduswamy, the then Archbishop of Bangalore, the church draws huge crowds on Thursday, the day dedicated to Infant Jesus.
- Masjid-e-Khadria is one of the most beautiful mosques in Bengaluru, located on Millers Road, this mosque hosts the prayers on Eid and also hosts the Haj camp.
- Gurudwara Sri Guru Singh Sabha (Ulsoor) is the oldest and the only major Sikh gurudwara in the heart of Bangalore. It is situated on the bank of Ulsoor lake. Traditional prayers start every morning 3am with the "Prakash" of Guru Granth Sahib followed by customary "Nitnem" (recitation of morning prayers) and kirtan. Sangat holds a special deewan every Sunday followed by Langar. Special programs happen on Guruprabs and other major Sikh festivals.
- Parsee Agiary (the fire temple), built in 1926, serves the 800 strong Parsi community in the city.
- Masjid - E - Bilal located at Bannerghatta road in BTM Layout is one of the largest mosques in the city of Bangalore

=== Other Spiritual attractions ===
- Ramakrishna Math, Ulsoor, a Ramakrishna Mission branch located at Ulsoor.
- Poornaprajna Vidyapeetha, a traditional gurukula and centre for excellence in Sanskrit, Indian philosophy and Indology – Poornaprajna Samshodhana Mandiram, is a 50-year-old residential Sanskrit college located near Vidyapeetha circle. Around 500 students are presently pursuing their studies in Indian lore from primary to doctorate level. This college is now affiliated to Karnataka Samskrit University, Bengaluru. The temples of Krishna, Durga (Lakshmi), Hanuman, Madhvacharya, Shiva, Ganapati, Navagraha, Naga and Sarpa, Vadirajatirtha and Raghavendratirtha also meditation and ceremony halls are the other major attractions for pilgrims and devotees. Many religious discourses, rituals and other traditional cultural activities take place regularly here.
- Art of Living Foundation is on the Kanakapura Road which is very famous for the serene ambiance and the rejuvenating effect of the atmosphere with the people worldwide visiting it to attend yoga meditation classes.
- Adiyogi - The Source of Yoga is in north of Bengaluru, near Chikballapura. Sadhguru Sannidhi, Bengaluru has been established as a powerful center for inner transformation. It features consecrated spaces such as the 112-ft Adiyogi, the Yogeshwar Linga and the Naga, where various offerings and processes for one’s immediate and ultimate wellbeing are available.

=== Shopping ===
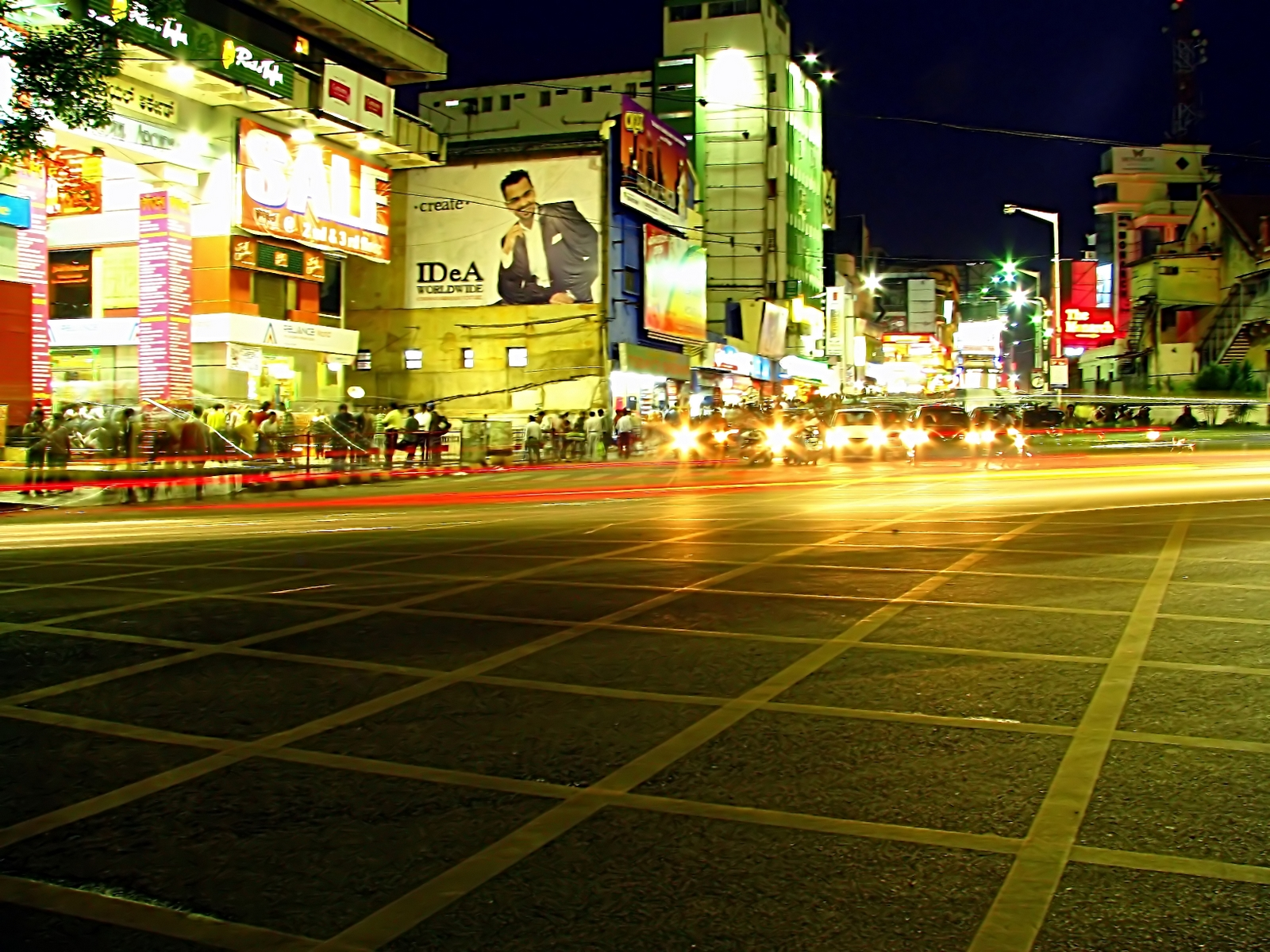
Brigade Road Bangalore

- Brigade Road
- Commercial Street
- MG Road was previously known as "South Parade".
- Chickpet
- UB City is famous for India's first luxury shopping mall.
- Phoenix Marketcity (Bangalore)
- Mantri Square

== Around Bengaluru ==
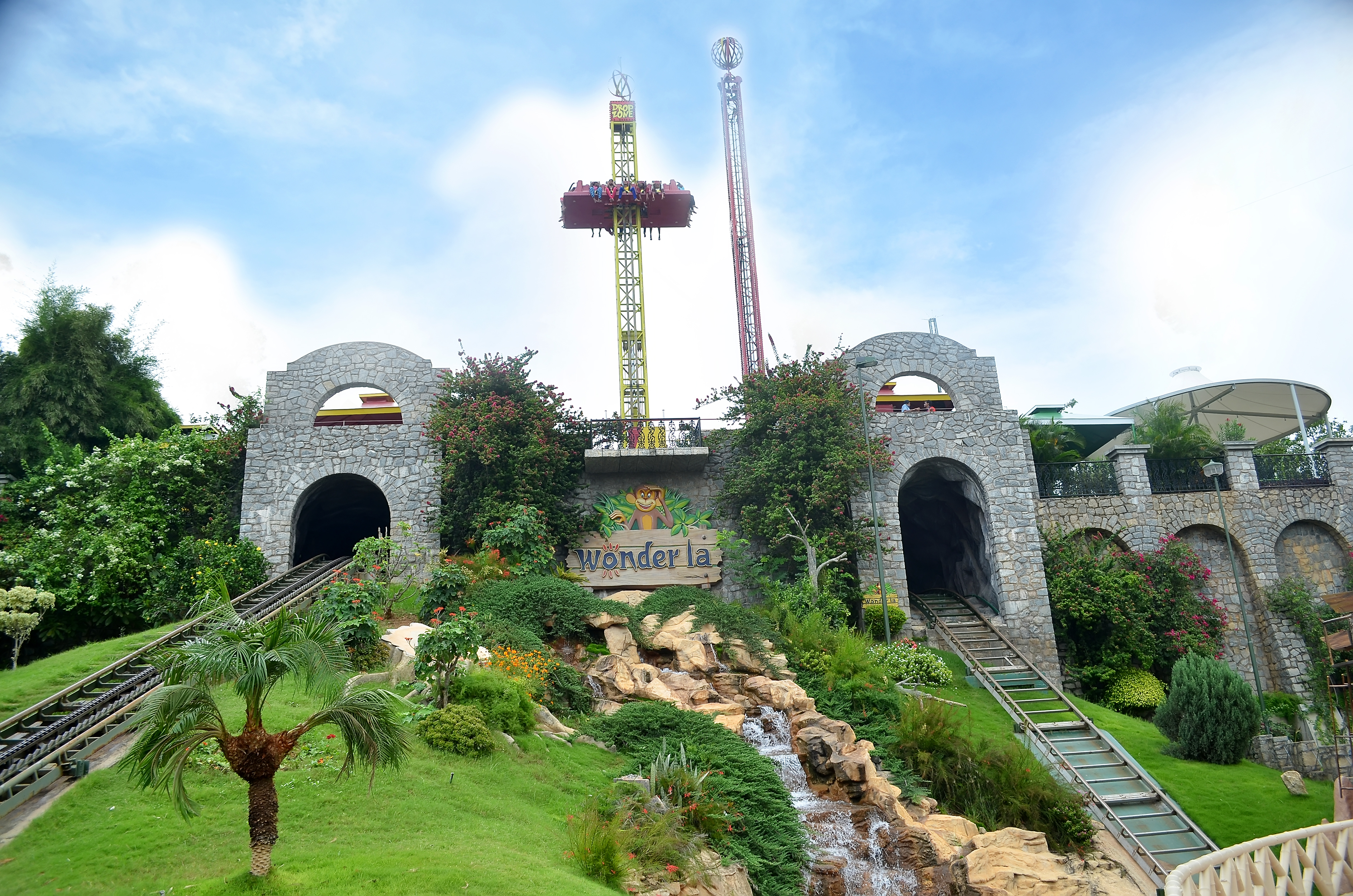
Wonderla water park, Bangalore

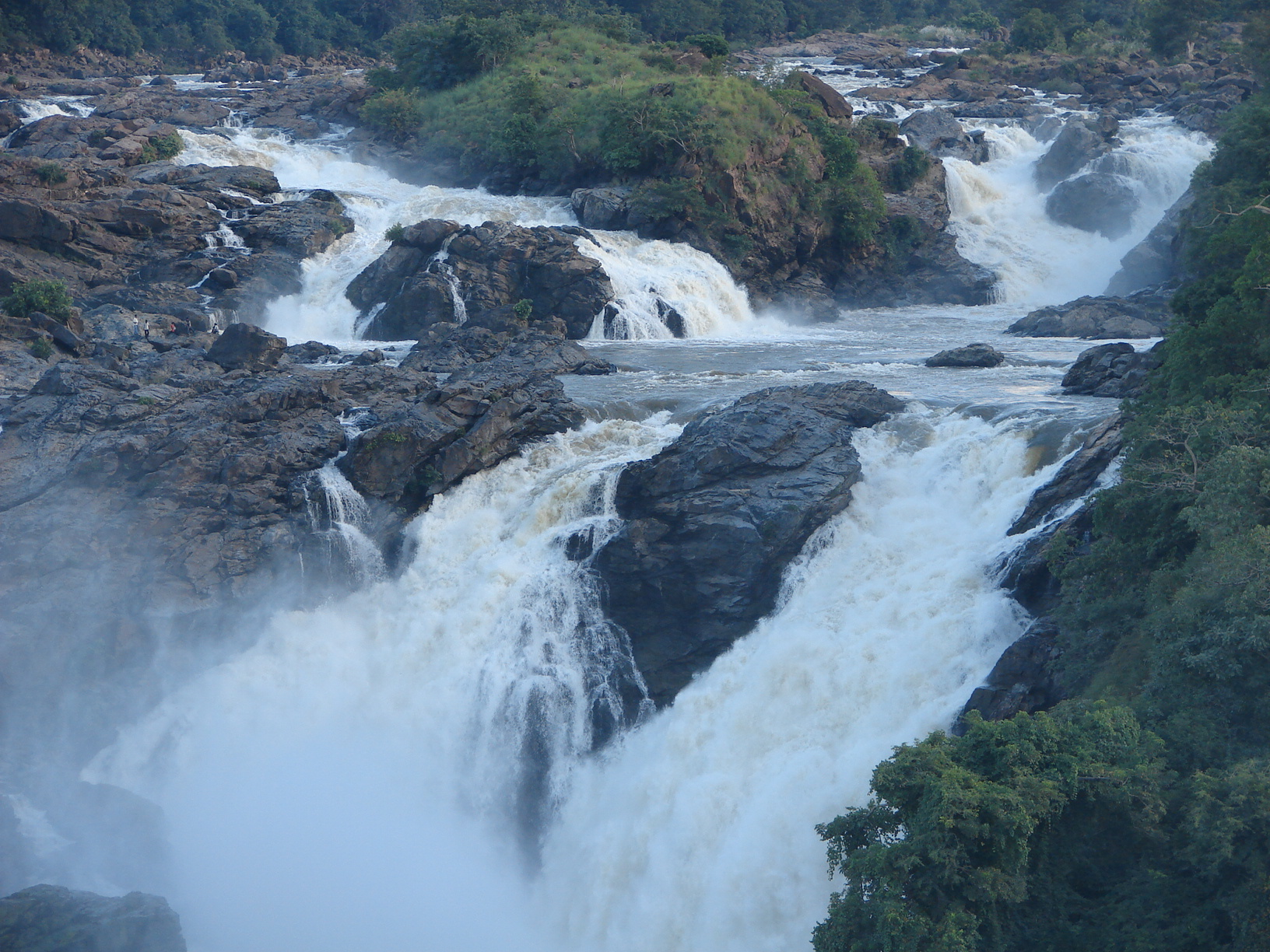
Shivanasamudra Falls drops 90 meters

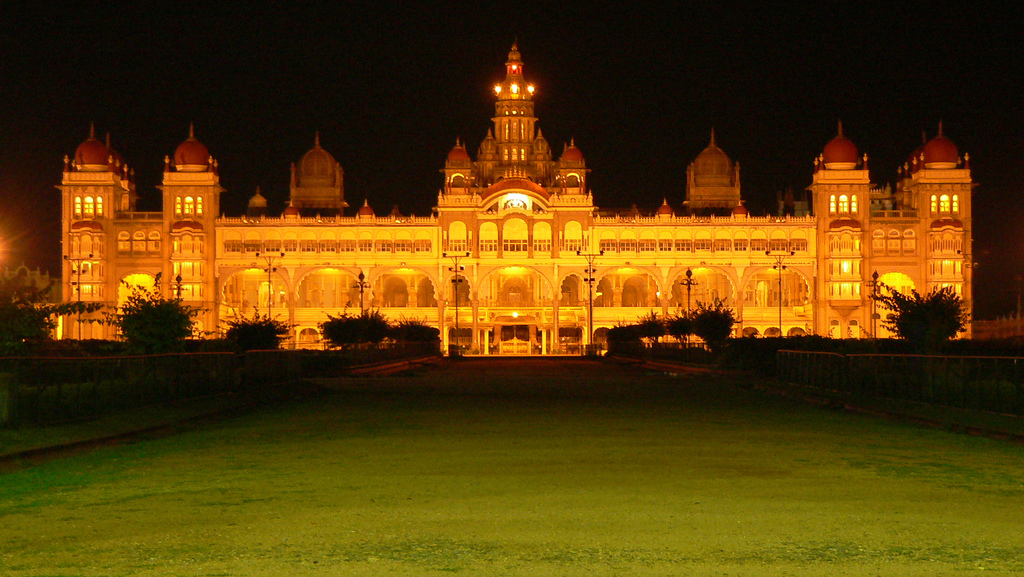
The Mysore Palace

- Antara Gange caves
- Avalabetta - This hill is around 90 km from Bangalore located near the Chikkaballapura district of Karnataka. It is an ideal place for nature lovers, bird watchers and rock climbers.
- Bilikal Rangaswamy Betta near Kanakapura
- Chennarayana Durga - This 17th century fort is around 104 km from Bangalore. Caves, water points and inscriptions on the fort walls are things to look forward to in this place.
- Dodda Alada Mara also called as Big Banyan tree is around 30 km from Bangalore. A single tree covers approximately around 3 acres!
- Manchinbele dam - It is a dam to harvest the catchment areas of rivers Arkavathy and Kumudavathi rivers. This is around 40 km from Bangalore.
- Muthyalamaduvu is a picnic spot near Anekal, 40 km from Bangalore. In the local Kannada language, Muthyalamaduvu means 'pearl valley' (muthu = pearl and maduvu = valley), apparently named for its 92-meter waterfall, whose falling water appears to look like drops of pearl.
- Kanva reservoir is an artificial lake and tourist attraction 69 km from Bangalore and 10 km from Ramanagara.
- Mekedaatu, literally meaning "Goat's Jump", is 110 km away on Kanakapura Road. Nearby is another tourist attraction, Sangama, where two rivers join.* Devarayanadurga (Kannada: ದೇವರಾಯನ ದುರ್ಗ) is a hill station near Tumkur in the state of Karnataka. It is 65 km from Bangalore. The rocky hills are surrounded by forest and the hilltops are dotted with several temples including the Yoganarasimha and the Bhoganarasimha temples and an altitude of 3,940 feet (1,200 m). It is also famous for Namada Chilume, a natural spring considered sacred and is also considered the origin of the Jayamangali river. Another famous temple in the area is the Mahalakshmi Temple at Goravanahalli.
- Madhugiri – Madhugiri fort was built in the 17th century. The place offers a climb to the top. The steep terrain of this fort is an interesting climb. From the top, it offers a great view of the surrounding landscape.
- Melukote is on the way to Mysore from Bangalore. The place is famous for its Vyramudi Utsava. The main deity here is "Cheluvarayaswamy - The MahaVishnuyam".
- Mysore (Officially Mysuru) (Kannada: ಮೈಸೂರು) is the second largest city in the state of Karnataka. It is the headquarters of the Mysore district and the Mysore division and lies about 140 km (87 mi) southwest of Bangalore. A short distance from Mysore city is the Krishnarajasagar Dam and the adjoining Brindavan Gardens where a musical fountain show is held in the evening. One of the most visited monuments in India, the Ambavilas Palace (also known as Mysore Palace) is the center of the Dasara festivities.
- Omthara Kala Kuteera is located just one hour from Bangalore city. It is built as homage to India's ancient culture and its vibrant art.
- Pyramid valley is the biggest pyramid shaped meditation hall in the world, along with being the largest pyramid in Asia. It stands at above 101 feet (31 m). Its base measures 160 ft (49 m) by 160 ft (49 m) with the main meditation area spanning 25,600 sq ft (2,380 m^{2}). It is located 30 km from Banashankari Temple.
- Ranganathittu
- Shivagange is a small hill in the Tumkur district of Karnataka. It is a place enjoyed by pilgrims and adventure enthusiasts alike. There is a temple and several viewpoints from the top of the hill.
- Shivanasamudra Falls (also called Sivasamudram) is an island town dividing the Kaveri River into twin waterfalls, the Gaganachukki and the Barachukki, dropping 90 m. The town is located 120 km from Bangalore, 27 km from Somanathapura and 80 km from Mysore in the Mandya district of the state of Karnataka.
- Skandagiri is 75 km away from Bangalore. Trekking point near to Nandi hills.
- Srirangapatna was the capital of Mysore under Hyder Ali and Tipu Sultan.
- Talakadu is a desert like town with temples at Cauvery river bank.
- Shravanabelagola is a historical Jain center situated on the way to Hassan and is quite famous for Gommateshvara Bahubali statue and several Jain temples.
- Thattekere – A lake near Bannerghatta National Park

== See also ==
- Tourism in Karnataka
- List of shopping malls in Bangalore
- List of hospitals in Bangalore
