= Law Museum Bangalore =

Museums in Bengaluru, India

Law Museum Bangalore is a museum dedicated to the law profession. The museum documents the journey of law and the high court in Karnataka. The museum showcases part of the original print of constitution of India. The museum was started in November 2006 to mark the 50th anniversary of Karnataka High Court. Karnataka High Court Chief justice Cyriac Joseph was the man behind this idea. In July 2012, the museum was closed briefly, to be reopened next year in July 2013 at a new location with in the same building.
