= Masjid-e-Bilal =

Mosque in Bangalore Urban, Karnataka, India

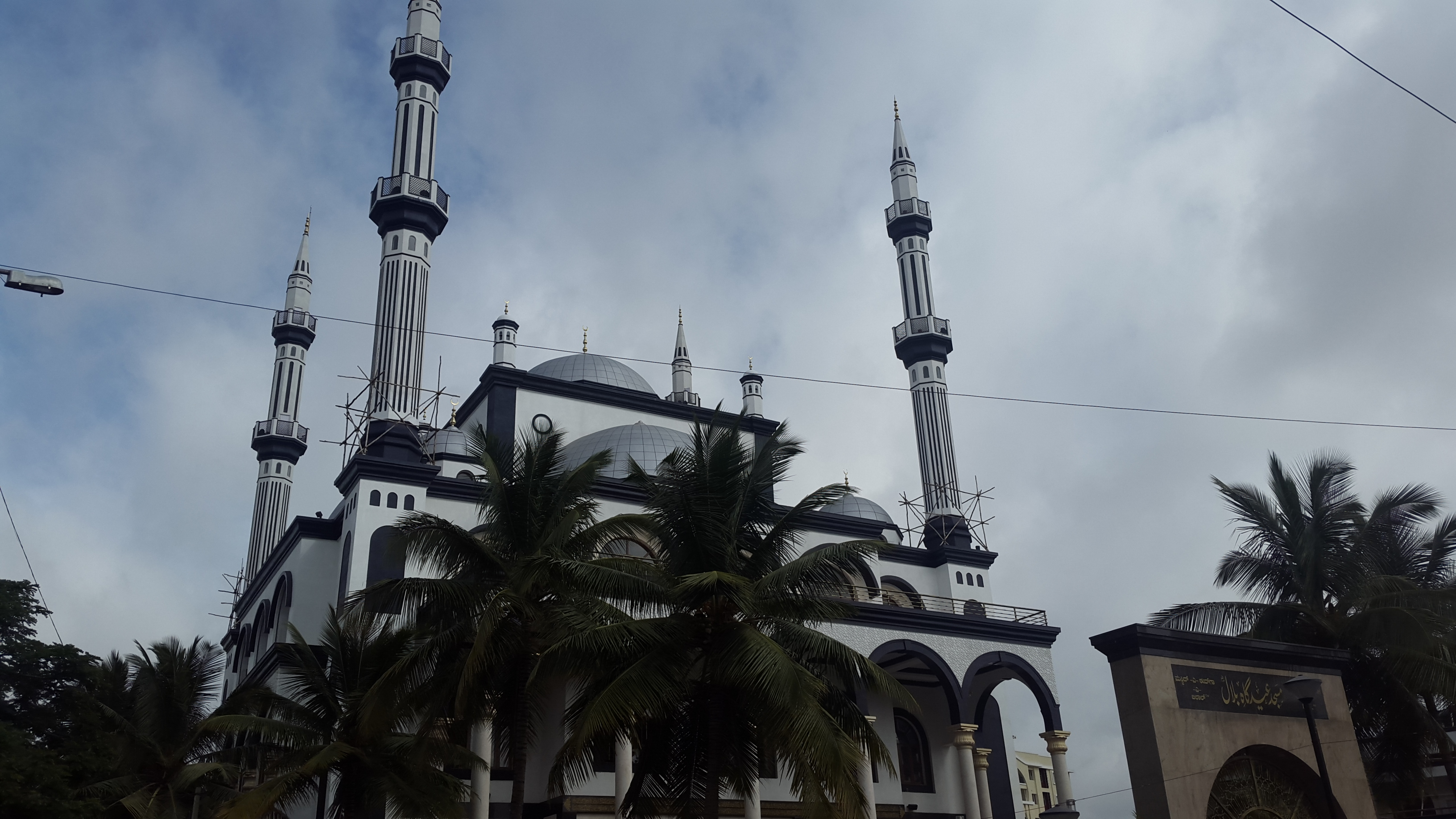
- The mosque, in 2015

- Location of the mosque in Karnataka

Religion
- Affiliation: Islam
- District: Bengaluru Urban
- Ecclesiastical or organisational status: Mosque
- Leadership: Hazrath Maulana Mohammed Shakirulla Saheb (Imam)
- Status: Active

Location
- Location: Bannerghatta Road, Bangalore Urban, Karnataka
- Country: India
- Coordinates: 12°55′15″N 77°35′59″E

Architecture
- Type: Mosque architecture
- Style: Ottoman
- Completed: 2015

Specifications
- Capacity: 6,500 worshippers
- Dome: Eleven
- Minaret: Four
- Site area: 3,900 m^{2} (42,000 sq ft)

The Masjid-e-Bilal, also known as the Bilal Mosque and the Masjid Eidgah Bilal or the Eidgah Bilal Mosque, is one of the largest mosques of Bangalore Urban, in the state of Karnataka, India. The Turkish-style mosque on Bannerghatta Road was consecrated on 11 June 2015.

== Overview ==
The mosque sits on the corner of a traffic intersection on a popular thoroughfare of southern part of the city. Prestige Group developers undertook the construction which began in 2010 and was completed in 2015. At that time Janab Alhaj Habeeb Khan was president of this committee from 2004 to 2015. The mosque constructed at a cost of Rs. 200,000,000 provides space for 6,500 people to pray at a time. A considerable portion of the cost was contributed by the Prestige Group.

The four story mosque was constructed on a portion of the 0.59-hectare (1.45-acre) Bilal Eidgah. The land was purchased in 1990 for the purpose of Eid congregation ground at a price of ₹ 10,000,000 from the Bangalore Development Authority. Local MLA and Ex transport Minister and Ex Home Minister of Karnataka Ramalinga Reddy helped the community to acquire the place.

Present president Alhaj Ashraf and secretary Alhaj Faiyaz told the Islamic Voice that the mosque occupies nearly 3,900 square metres (42,000 sq ft). The Eidgah ground provides parking space for nearly 500 vehicles.

The mosque’s religious leadership includes Maulana Iqbal Rashadi (Imam), Maulana Mohammed Shakirulla Rashadi (Khatib), Maulana Abdul Razzaque Qasmi (Imam and Qazi), and Maulana Mukhtar Saheb (Muazzin). Maulana Qasim Qureshi was the chief guest at the mosque's 2015 inauguration.

== See also ==
- Islam in India
- List of mosques in India
