= Thottikallu =

Village in Karnataka, India

Coordinates: 12.806026°N 77.537985°E

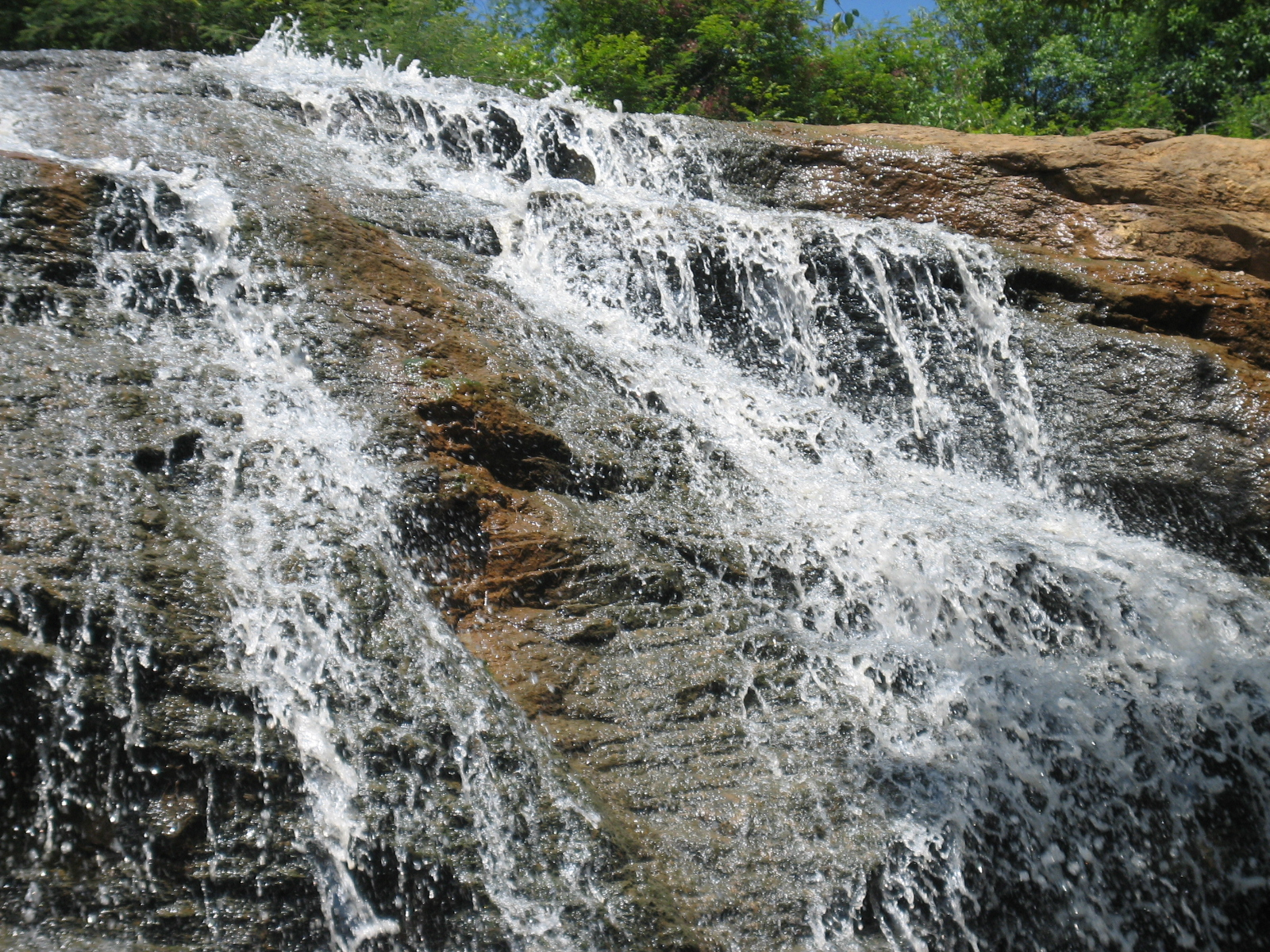
A view of the TK Falls.

Thottikallu is a place near Bangalore off the Kanakapura road in the Bangalore Urban district. It is famous for a falls called Thottikallu falls, more popularly known as TK falls.

It is also known as 'SwarnaMukhi' water falls. SwarnaMukhi translates as 'Golden-Faced'. The route at Kagalpura (Kaggalipura) off the Bangalore - Kanakapura road will lead to Byalemaradadoddi, from where a mud road leads to the falls. The place also has a small shrine.

Although it seems like a natural structure, source of the waterfall seems to be a walled structure on a rock from which water is allowed through a piped opening.

== Access ==
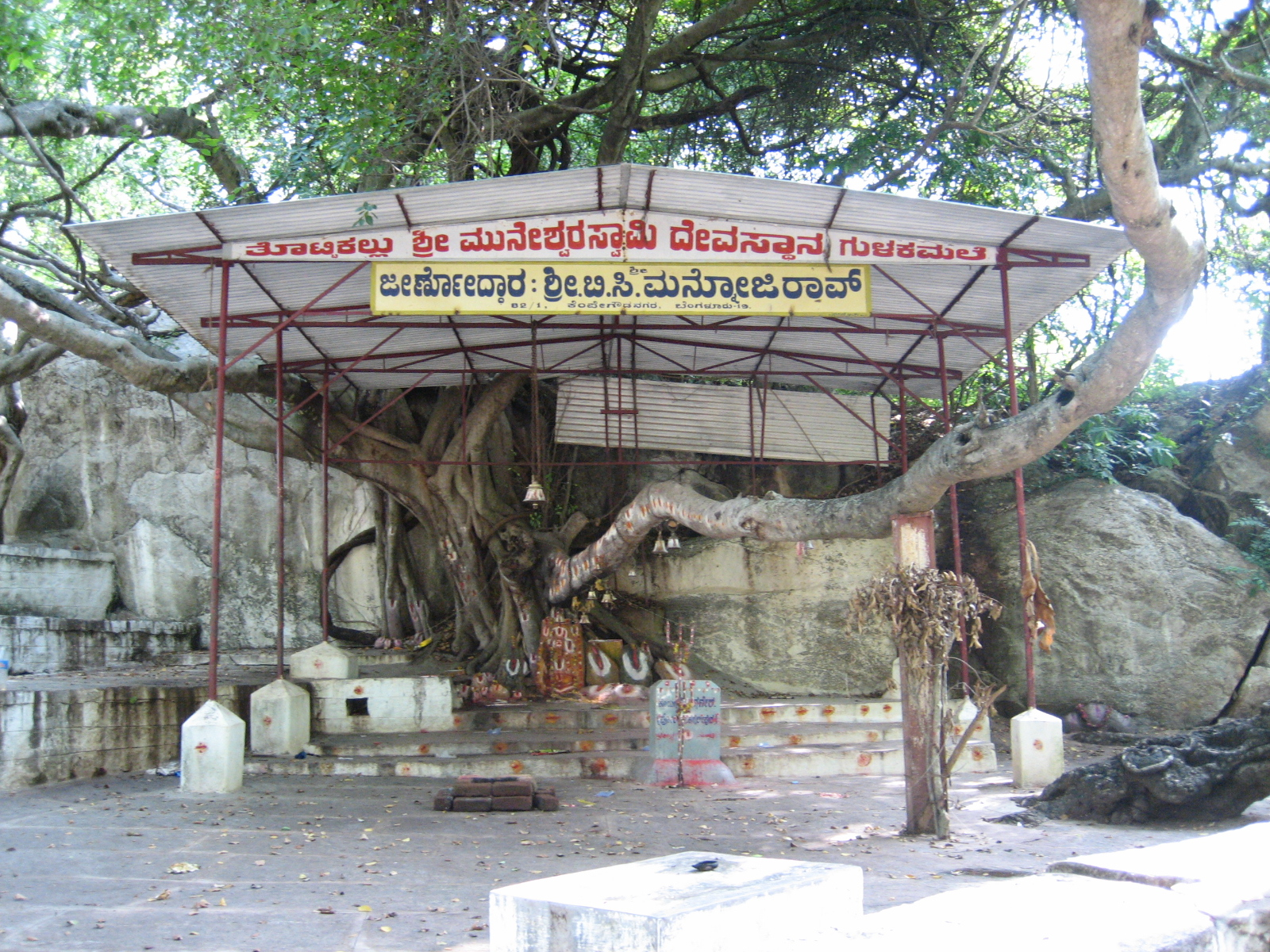
The Muneeshwara Swamy shrine near TK Falls.

There is no entry to the Thottikallu Falls as it belongs to Karnataka Forest Department and is considered an elephant corridor. The area is protected and trespassers are fined. Despite the restrictions people flock to the falls during weekends.
