= Gandhi Bhavan, Bengaluru =

Museum in Bangalore, Karnataka, India

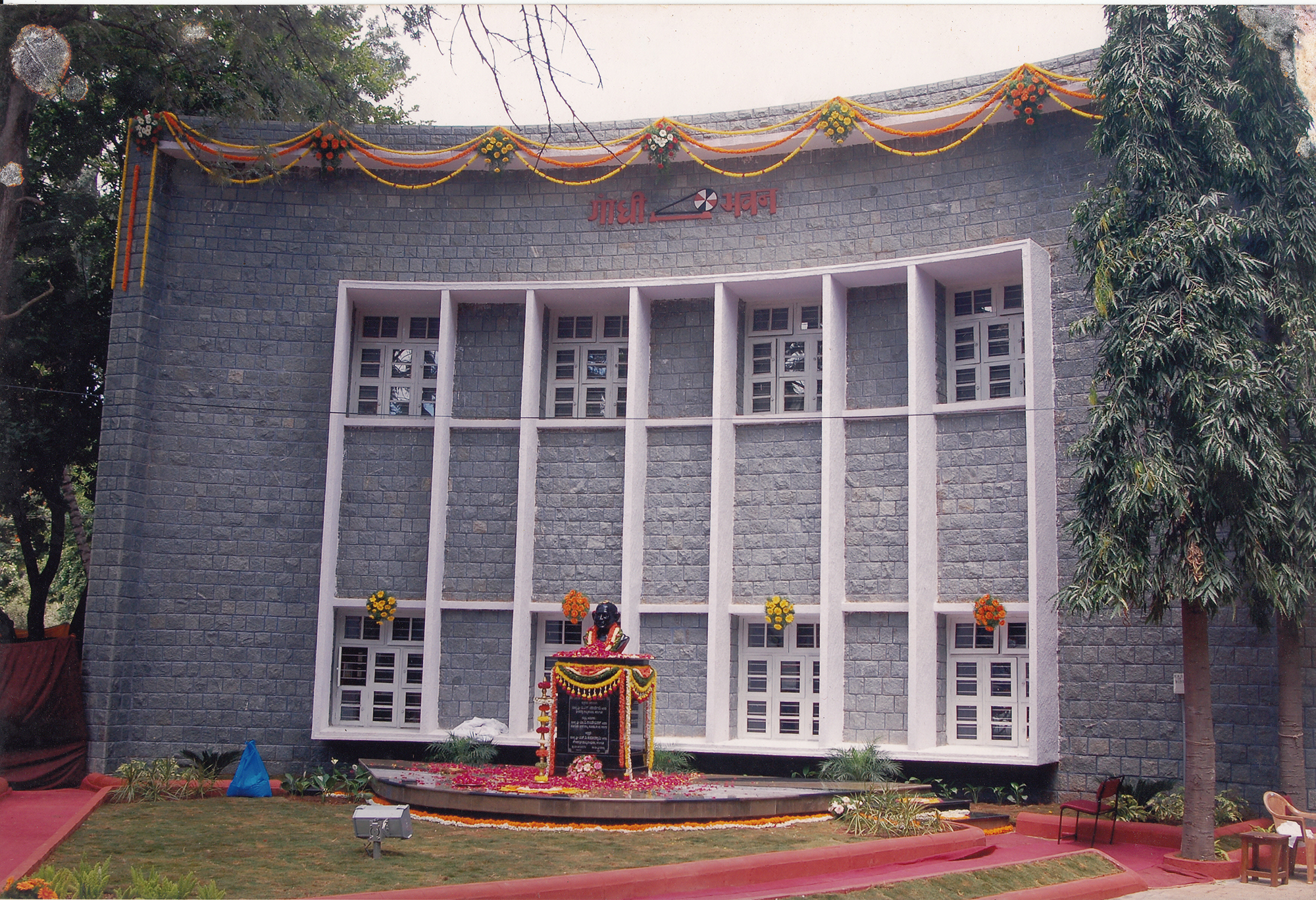
- Former name: Gandhi Smaraka Nidhi
- Established: 1965; 61 years ago
- Location: Kumara Park East, Bengaluru, Karnataka 560001
- Coordinates: 12.988117°N 77.579826°E
- Website: gandhibhavankarnataka.org

Gandhi Bhavan is a museum dedicated to Mahatma Gandhi situated in Bengaluru, Karnataka. It was inaugurated in 1965 by then President of India Dr. S. Radhakrishnan. The museum consists of a gallery with rare photographs of Mahatma Gandhi and letters written by him, a library and an auditorium. It serves as a venue for meetings organised on Gandhian values in Bengaluru.

== History ==
The museum is said to be set up in the place where Gandhi used to take strolls. It was initially known as Gandhi Smaraka Nidhi under the chairmanship of Rajendra Prasad. In 1965, it was renamed as Gandhi Bhavan and was inaugurated by S. Radhakrishnan. At that time, the museum's land was in its possession in form of a lease. Later, Sri Ramakrishna Hegde, during his tenure as the Chief Minister of Karnataka donated the land to Gandhi Bhavan. The main aim of Gandhi Bhavan was to propagate Gandhian philosophies and ideals among the people of the state, especially among the youth.
