= Madras Sappers Museum and Archives =

The Madras Sappers Museum and Archives depicts the history of the Madras Engineering Group, also known as the Sappers. The museum was established in the year 1979 and is situated in Bengaluru, Karnataka, India. The museum showcases a gallery of the regiment's generals, as well as army artifacts, historical achievements, attire, armour, and more than 4800 books and maps used by the regiment. The museum is not open to the public; only people with special permission from the Indian Army are allowed to enter the museum. The museum also contains rare and antique artifacts from the 18th and 19th centuries and historical information posted on its walls.

Some of the famed possessions of the museum include a picture of three Indian soldiers supporting the Bangalore torpedo, a Victoria Cross and five Indian Orders of Merit (IOM), which was highest honor by the British to Indian soldiers at that time.
