= Thattekere =

Tattekere
- Village
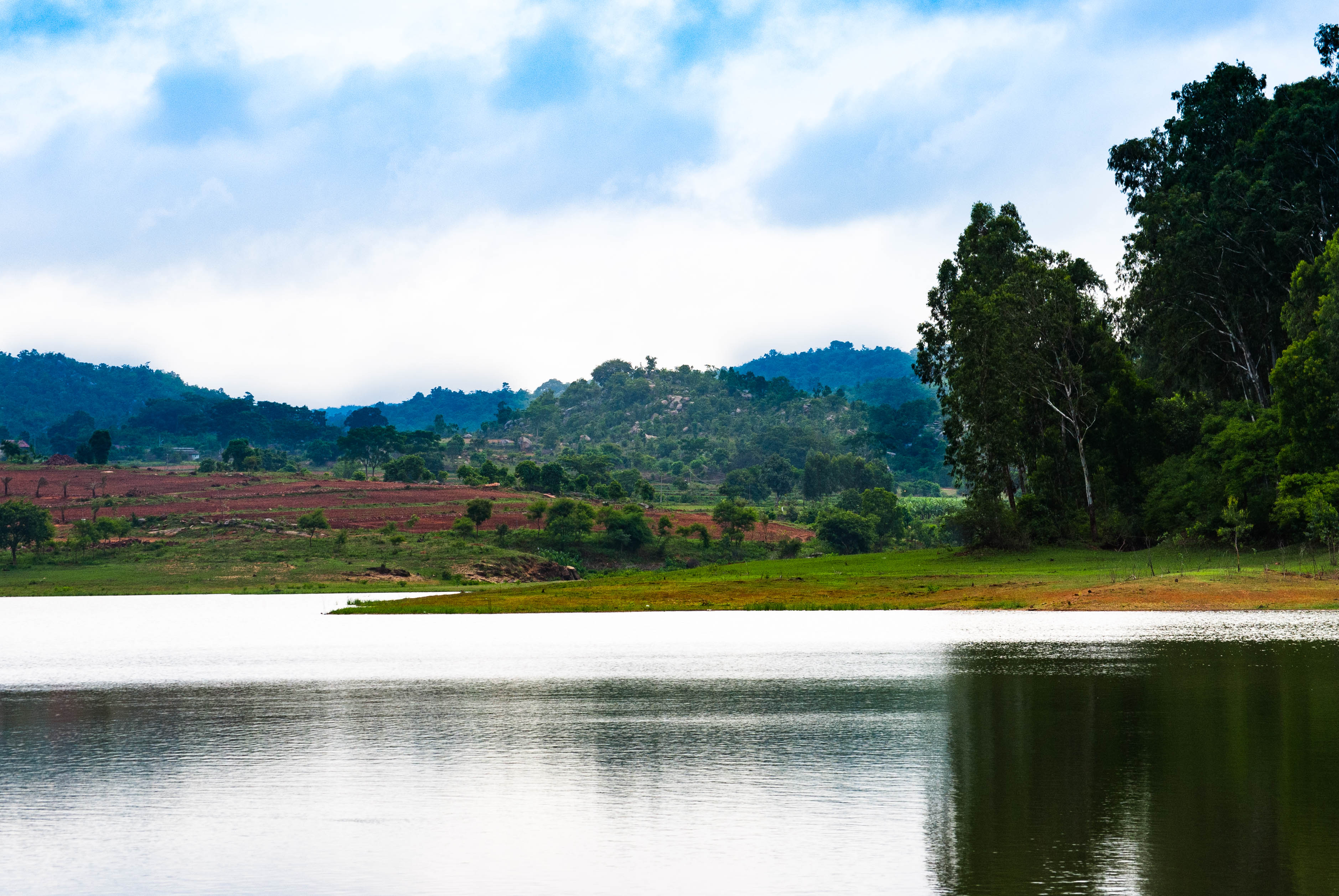
- Interactive map of Tattekere
- Coordinates: 12.67209°N 77.57345°E
- Country: India
- State: Karnataka
- District: Bengaluru South
- Taluks: Kanakapura

Languages
  - Official: Kannada
- Time zone: UTC+5:30 (IST)
- Nearest city: Bengaluru

Tattekere is a village in Kanakapura taluk in Bengaluru South district, 40 km away from Bengaluru. It had a population of 1,293 in 2011. The village derives its name from a lake there which is a picnic spot, "tatte" means plate and "kere" means lake in native Kannada language.

A Mahadeshwara temple is there in the village on west side of the Tattekere lake, situated in elephant corridor of Bannerghatta National Park and it is a birdwatching place. Another tourist attraction Muthyalamaduvu is nearby.

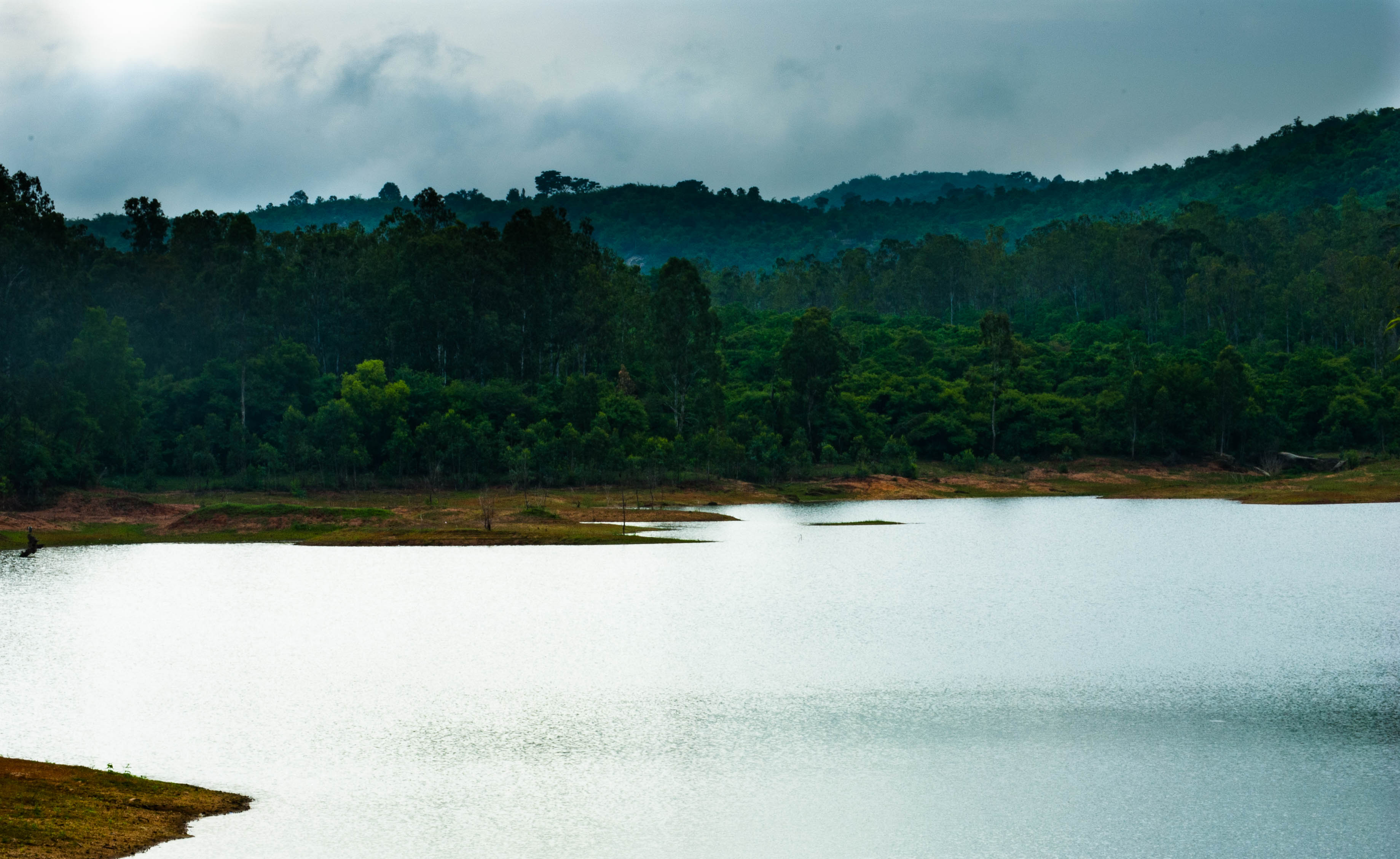
Forest in the background
