= Muthyala Maduvu =

Muthyala maduvu
- Tourist Spot
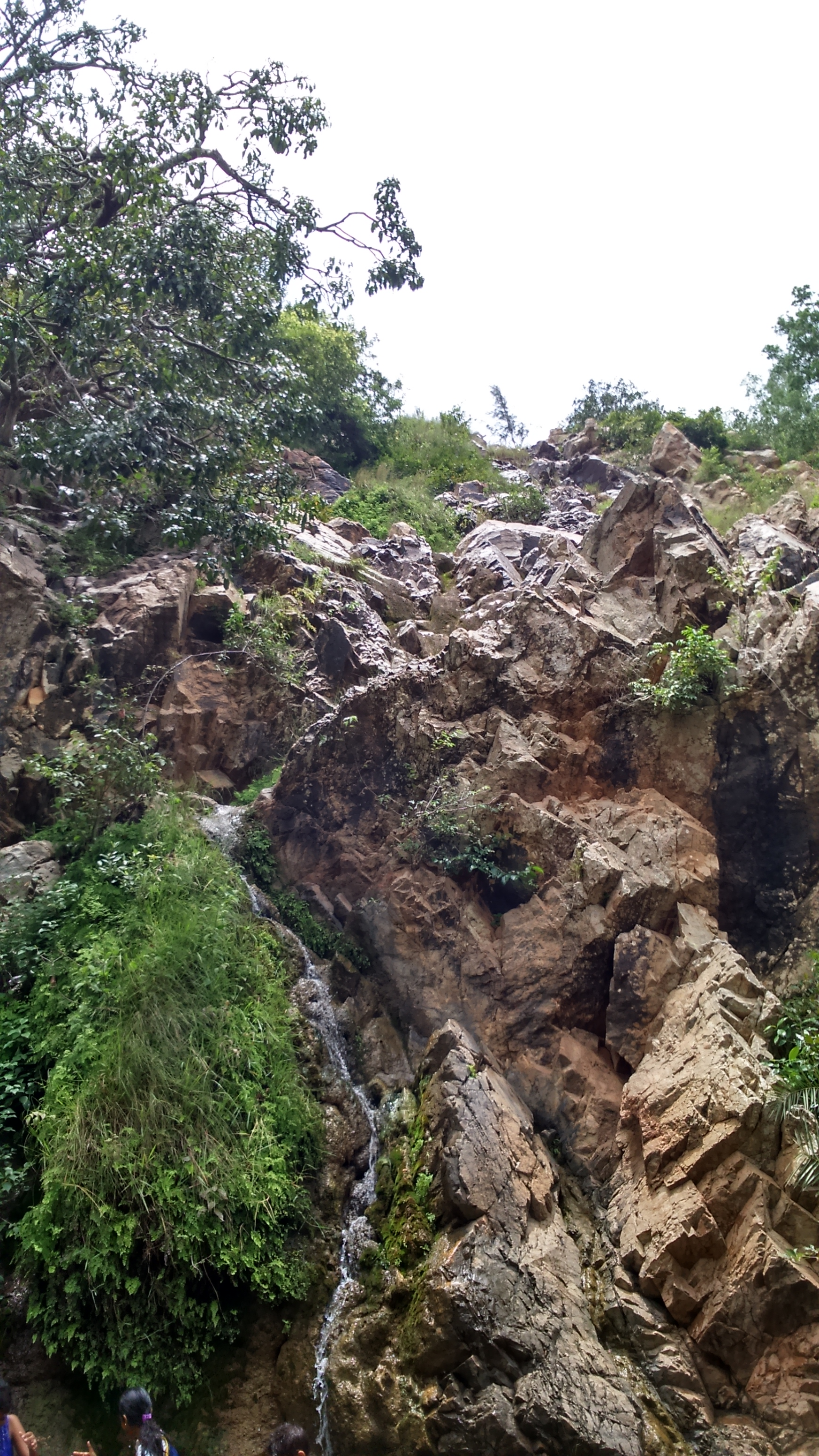
- Nickname: Pearl Valley
- Interactive map of Muthyala maduvu
- Coordinates: 12.688097°N 77.664485°E

Muthyalamaduvu is a tourist attraction located near Anekal, Bengaluru Urban, Karnataka. The place is also known as Pearl Valley.

It is located 5km from Anekal and 40km from Bangalore. From the Anekal-Thally Road, visitors take a right turn to reach Muthyalamaduvu.

== Tourism ==
The place is known for its waterfall and the mountain ranges it overlooks. The water from the falls slides down the flora of the place creating an illusion of a string of pearls, hence the name Pearl Valley.

Near the waterfall, there is a temple (dedicated to Lord Shiva). A puja (prayer) is done once every morning.

The place has a rich concentration of birds owing to the presence of the waterfall. The mountain ranges are also visited by trekking enthusiasts. Another tourist attraction, Thattekere lake, is nearby. Trekking is the major adventure sport. Because of the open forest area and near to the city limits accessible to everyone, giving an opportunity to trek.

== See also ==
- List of waterfalls
- List of waterfalls in India
