= Siddhaganga Intercity Express =

Train in India

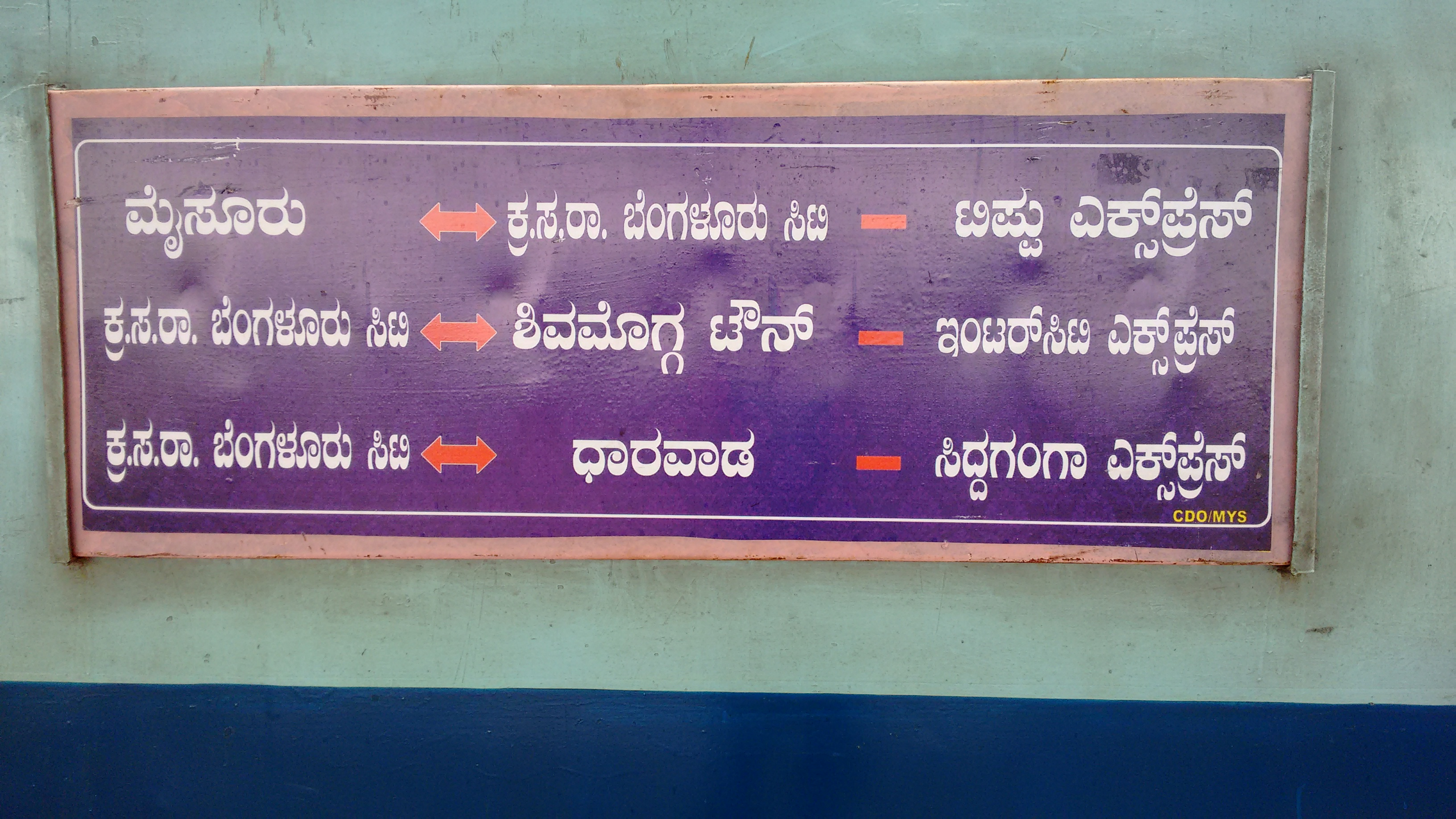
- Train board

Overview
- Service type: Express
- First service: 1 July 1997; 29 years ago
- Current operator: South Western Railway

Route
- Termini: Dharwad (DWR); KSR Bengaluru City (SBC)
- Stops: 16
- Distance travelled: 490 km (304 mi)
- Average journey time: 08 hours 40 mins
- Service frequency: Daily
- Train number: 12725 / 12726

On-board services
- Classes: AC chair car, General Unreserved
- Seating arrangements: Yes
- Sleeping arrangements: No
- Catering facilities: On-board catering E-catering
- Baggage facilities: No
- Other facilities: Overhead racks

Technical
- Rolling stock: ICF coach
- Track gauge: 1,676 mm (5 ft 6 in)
- Operating speed: 55 km/h (34 mph)
Route map
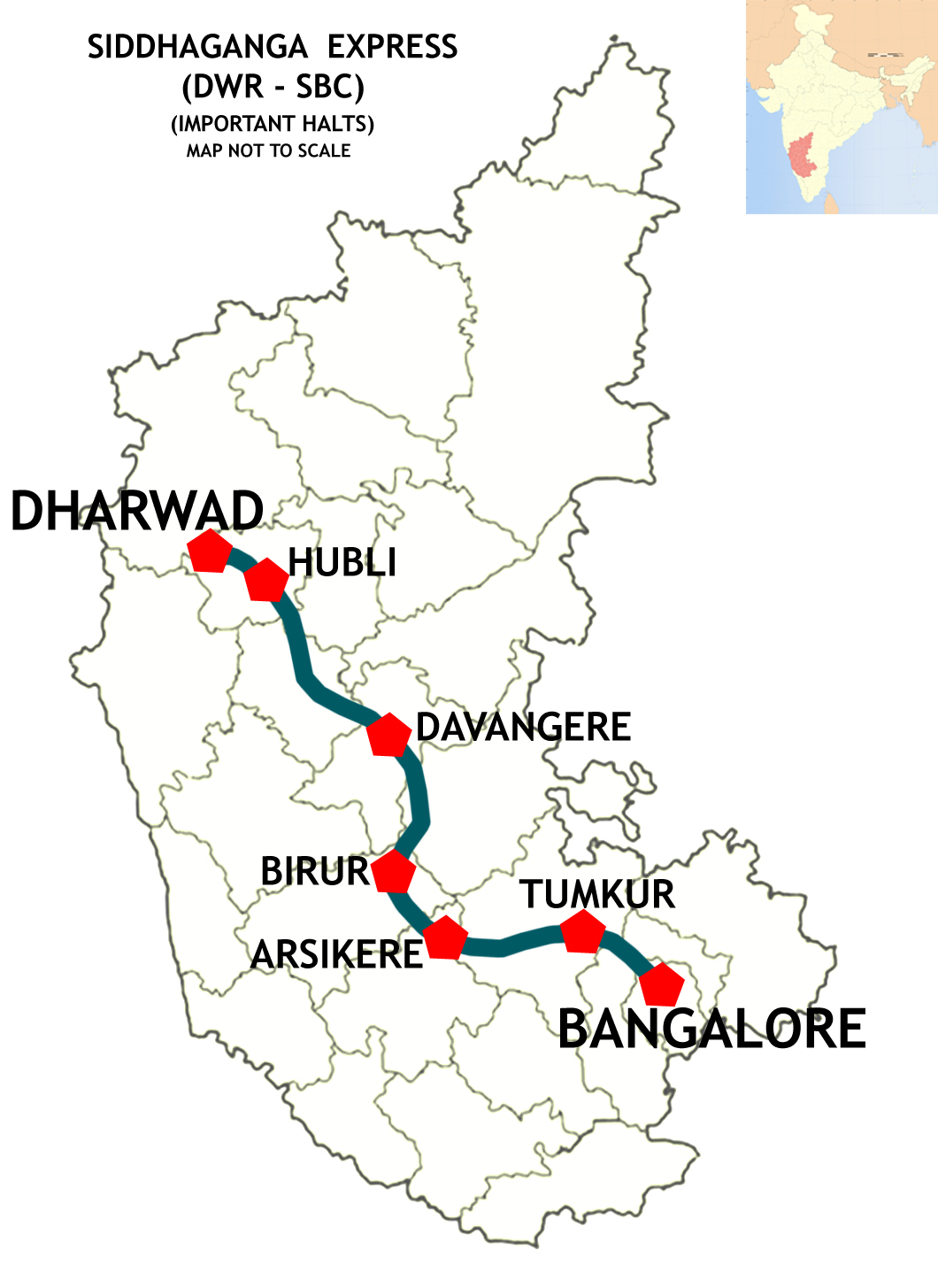

The 12725 / 12726 Siddhaganga Intercity Express, formerly Intercity Express is a daily express train that runs between Dharwad and Bengaluru in Karnataka, India and it replaced Bangalore City (KSR Bengaluru) - Hubli (Hubballi) Shatabdi Express. and until 2009, this train ran from Hubballi to Bengaluru. It was extended to Dharwad on 8 December 2009. It takes 8 hours 50 minutes to cover 490 kilometres (300 mi). It has 17 stops and 65 intermediate Stations. It is numbered as 12725/12726. The train belongs to Mysuru Division of South Western Railway.

== Route & halts ==
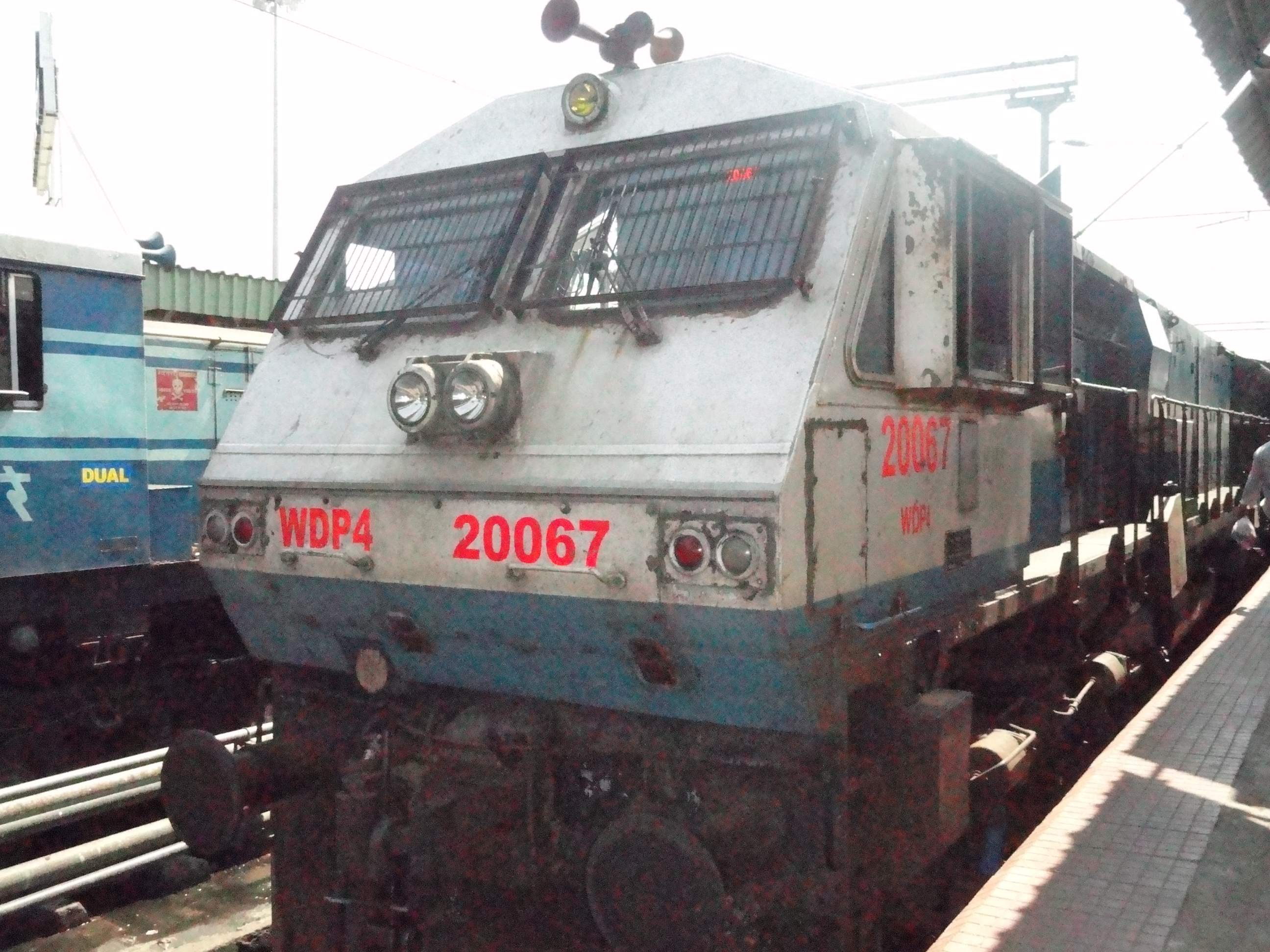
12725 Siddaganga express at SBC

The train is runs from Dharwad via Hubli, Yalivigi, Haveri, Byadgi, Ranibennur, Harihar, Davangere, Chikjajur, Hosadurga Road, Ajjampura, Birur, Kadur, Arsikere, Tiptur, Tumakuru, Yeshwantpur to KSR Bengaluru City.

== Traction ==
earlier was WDP-4. The train is hauled by a Krishnarajapuram Loco Shed based WAP-7 electric locomotive from end to end.

== Speed ==
The train reaches 110 kilometres per hour (68 mph) between Yesvantpur and Tumakuru. Its average speed is 55 kilometres per hour (34 mph).

== Rake and rake sharing ==
The train carries 21 coaches, including one air-conditioned coach. It shares its rake with Wodeyar Express and the Bangalore City– Talaguppa Intercity Express. Its maintenance happens at Mysuru.

Day 1 - 12613->20651 Day 2 - 20652->12725 Day 3 - 12726->12614
