= State Highway 47 (Karnataka) =

Road in Karnataka, India

State Highway 47

Route information
- Maintained by Karnataka Road Development Corporation Limited
- Length: 378.77 km (235.36 mi)

Major junctions
- South end: Mandya
- North end: Hoovina Hadagali

Location
- Country: India
- State: Karnataka
- Districts: Mandya, Hassan, Tumkur, Chiradurga, Davanagere, Vijayanagara
- Primary destinations: Mandya, Melukote, Shravanabelagola, Tiptur, Hosadurga, Harapanahalli, Hoovina Hadagali

Highway system
- Roads in India; Expressways; National; State; Asian; State Highways in Karnataka

State Highway 47 also known as SH-47 is a state highway connecting Mandya of Mandya district and Hoovina Hadagali of Vijayanagara district, in the South Indian state of Karnataka. It has a total length of 377.78 kilometres (234.74 mi) and is one of the longest state highways in Karnataka.

Major towns and villages on SH-47 are: Mandya, Holalu, Shivalli, Jakkanahalli Cross, Kadalagere, Melukote, Halagehosahalli, Aghalaya, Aruvanahalli, Shravanabelagola, Jinnathapura, Halebelagola, Mattanaviley, Chinnenahalli, Banankere, Hulikere, Karekere-Muddanahalli-Samudravalli, Nuggehalli, Hunaseghatta, Aaladahalli, Tiptur, Halkurike, Mathighatta, Solaramavu, Huliyar, Srinivasapura, Yalanadu, Heggere, Srirampura, Naigere, Somasandra, Hagalakere, Hosadurga, Madhure, Devigere, Beesanahalli, N.G Halli Cross, Uganikatte, Holalkere, Adanur, Banagere, Chikjajur, Rangavvanahalli, Saasalu, T.B Halli, Mayakonda, Dindadahalli, Sultanipura, Aanagodu, Giriyapura, Anaji, Uchangidurga, Punabagatta, Thowduru, Arsikere, Nicchavvana halli, Komarana halli, Harapanahalli, Madapura, Komarana halli Thanda, Nagatibasapura, Devagondanahalli and Hoovina Hadagali.
