= Hanumanakatte =

- Village
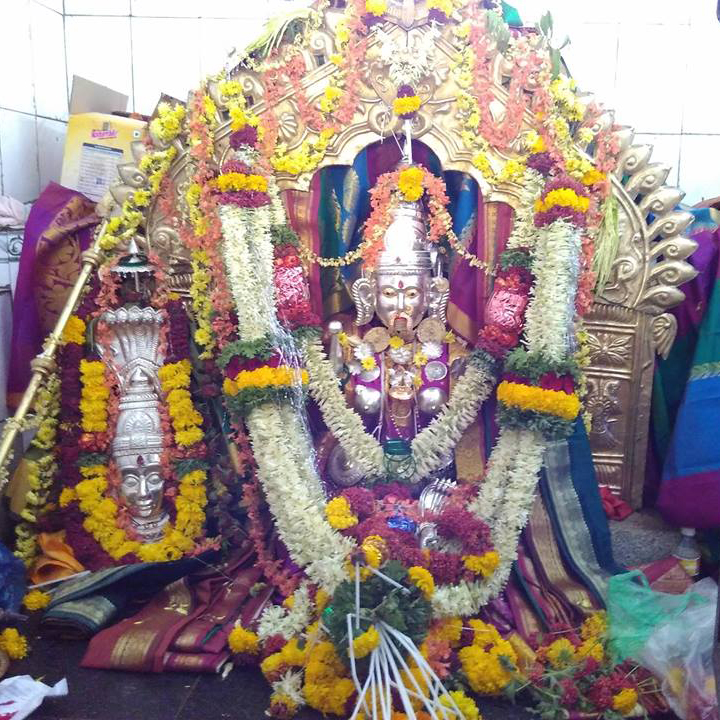
- Lord Kenchamba Devi at Hanumanakatte after a special decoration

- Location in Karnataka, India
- Coordinates: 14.042°N 76.184°E
- Country: India
- State: Karnataka
- District: Chitradurga

Area
  - Total: 6 km^{2} (2.3 sq mi)
- Elevation: 305 m (1,001 ft)

Population (2011)
  - Total: 500
  - Density: 60/km^{2} (160/sq mi)

Languages
  - Official: Kannada
- Time zone: UTC+5:30 (IST)
- PIN: 577557
- Telephone code: 08191
- Vehicle registration: KA-16

Hanumanakatte (Village ID 605717) is a small village in the Holalkere taluk near Chitradurga district, Karnataka State, India. According to the 2011 census it has a population of 268 living in 64 households. Its main agriculture product is maize growing.

The main attraction is an old temple of Lord Kenchamba Devi. According to historical sources, this is a very old temple. Every year in the last week of March the village fair is celebrated. Kannada is the mother tongue. The nearest railway stations are Amritapura (3 km away) and Chikjajur (10 km away).
