= Akkanahalli =

Akkanahalli may refer to:

- Akkanahalli, Hassan, a village in the Channarayapatna taluk of Hassan district in Karnataka, India
- Akkanahalli, Tumkur, a village in the Chiknayakanhalli taluk of Tumkur district in Karnataka, India
