= Chikjajur =

- town
- Nickname: Jajur
- Location in Karnataka, India
- Coordinates: 14.126°N 76.141°E
- Country: India
- State: Karnataka
- District: Chitradurga

Population
  - Total: 8,000

Languages
  - Official: Kannada
- Time zone: UTC+5:30 (IST)
- PIN: 577523
- Telephone code: 08191875
- Vehicle registration: KA-16

Chikjajur is a town in Karnataka. The town is served by a railway line. Chikjajur later emerged as the market centre for surrounding regions there.

The town is known for the 500-year-old Temple of Lord Maruthi.

== See also ==
- Hagalavadi
- Gubbi
- Bukkapatna
- Hosdurga
- Holalkere
- Huliyar
- Tumkur
- Davanagere
