= Kallambella =

Coordinates: 13°38′N 76°55′E

Kallambella is a village in Tumkur district of Karnataka state of India.

Situated at a distance of 36 km (22.4 mi) north of Tumkur, off the National Highway 48.

A large tank, supposed to have been built by 'Holampayya', is the main attraction of the place. This tank acts as a reservoir for the Hemavati river waters, on their way to Sira tank.

== Crops ==
Rice, Arecanut, Ragi, and Groundnuts are the main crops grown here.

== See also ==
- Hagalavadi
- Bukkapatna
