= State Highway 76 (Karnataka) =

Road in Karnataka, India

State Highway 76

Route information
- Maintained by Karnataka Road Development Corporation Limited
- Length: 217.20 km (134.96 mi)

Major junctions
- South end: Birur
- North end: Sammasagi (Heralikoppa)

Location
- Country: India
- State: Karnataka
- Primary destinations: Birur, Santhebennur, Davangere, Harihara

Highway system
- Roads in India; Expressways; National; State; Asian; State Highways in Karnataka

State Highway 76, also known as SH-76, is a state highway connecting Birur town of Chikmagalur district and Sammasagi village of Haveri district, in the South Indian state of Karnataka. It has a total length of 217.20 kilometres (134.96 mi).

Major town and villages on the highway are: Birur, Dogihalli, Nagavangala, Ajjampura, Bukkambudi, Karkikere, Malleshwara, Medugondanahalli, Maravanji, Honnebaagi, Channagiri, Garaga, Kakanur, Santhebennur, Geddala hatti, Bhimaneri, Thanigere, Hiretholageri, Kurki, Tholahunase, Anagodu, Davangere, Karuru, Neelanahalli, Amaravati, Harihara, Chalageri, Itagi, Halageri, Kusaguru, Koda, Bogavi, Hamsa bavi, Thumarikoppa, Tilavalli, Inam Lakmapura, Honkana, Makaravalli, Hire Kounshi, Kyasnur, Hulaginahalli and Sammasagi (Helari Koppa).
