= K. B. Siddaiah =

Indian sociopolitical-philosopher, writer, poet, and social activist (1954–2019)

- Born: 2 March 1954; Kenkere, Tumkur, Karnataka, India
- Died: 19 October 2019 (aged 65); Bangalore, Karnataka, India
- Occupations: Professor; poet; scholar; writer; critic
- Spouse: Gangarajamma
- Children: 3
- Writing career
- Language: Kannada
- Genres: Poetry; continental poetry; drama; research; criticism
- Subjects: Social life; modern literature
- Movement: Dalit movement

Kenkere Bailappa Siddaiah (2 March 1954 – 19 October 2019), commonly known as Prof. K. B. Siddaiah or simply KB, was an Indian poet, sociopolitical–philosopher, writer and social activist known for his works in Kannada language. For his contribution to Kannada literature, he was awarded the Karnataka Rajyotsava Award by the Government of Karnataka in 2013.

== Personal life ==
Siddaiah was born in Kenkere in Tumkuru to Bailurappa and Anthuramma. He married Gangarajamma and had three children.

== Career ==
Siddaiah started his career as an English lecturer and got involved in Dalit movement in Karnataka and became a prominent leader in the movement. He was one of the founding members of the Dalita Sangharsha Samiti.

== Literary works ==
KB's poems were mostly based on social life of the marginalized people. His poems including ’Ee naada manninalli’ inspired people across the state to join the Dalit movement.

Collections of poems

- Bakaala
- Daklakathadevi Kavya
- Anaatma
- Gallebaani

Prose

- Buddhana Naalku Shreshtasatyagalu
- Katthalodane Maathukathe

Editions

- Dalitha Kavya

== Death ==
Siddaiah met with a road accident and admitted in Manipal hospital in Bangalore and died eventually on 18 October in 2019. He was survived by his wife and 3 children.

== Accolades ==
- 2004 – Karnataka Sahitya Academy Award
- 2013 – Karnataka Rajyotsava Award by Government of Karnataka
- 2017 – President at the 12th Tumkur Jilla Kannada Sahitya Sammelana
- 2018 – Ki. Ram. Nagaraj Award
