= Birur (disambiguation) =

Birur may refer to:

== Concepts ==
Birur (Kabbalah) (Beirur/Birurim), in Lurianic Kabbalah Jewish mysticism, "sifting" of physicality to redeem sparks of holiness

== Places ==
Birur, town in Chikkamagaluru district in the state of Karnataka, India
