= Talikatte =

Village in Karnataka, India

Coordinates: 13°57′N 76°05′E

Talikatte is a village in the Holalkere Taluk of Chitradurga district in Karnataka. About 1700 families live in this village. Majority of people living in this village belong to the Kuruba Gowda caste.

It has become famous all over India as the village home to about 810 teachers. No other village in India has produced so many teachers. Each family in the village has at least one person in the teaching profession. The teachers of Talikatte have settled all over Karnataka.

== Transportation ==
The nearest railway station is Ramagiri, which is 3km far away from the village.
