= Ganadhal =

Ganadhal Ganadhala
- village
- Location in Karnataka, India Ganadhal (India)
- Coordinates: 15°58′42″N 77°25′29″E
- Country: India
- State: Karnataka
- District: Raichur
- Taluk: Raichur

Population (2001)
  - Total: 4,266

Languages
  - Official: Kannada
- Time zone: UTC+5:30 (IST)
- Vehicle registration: KA-36

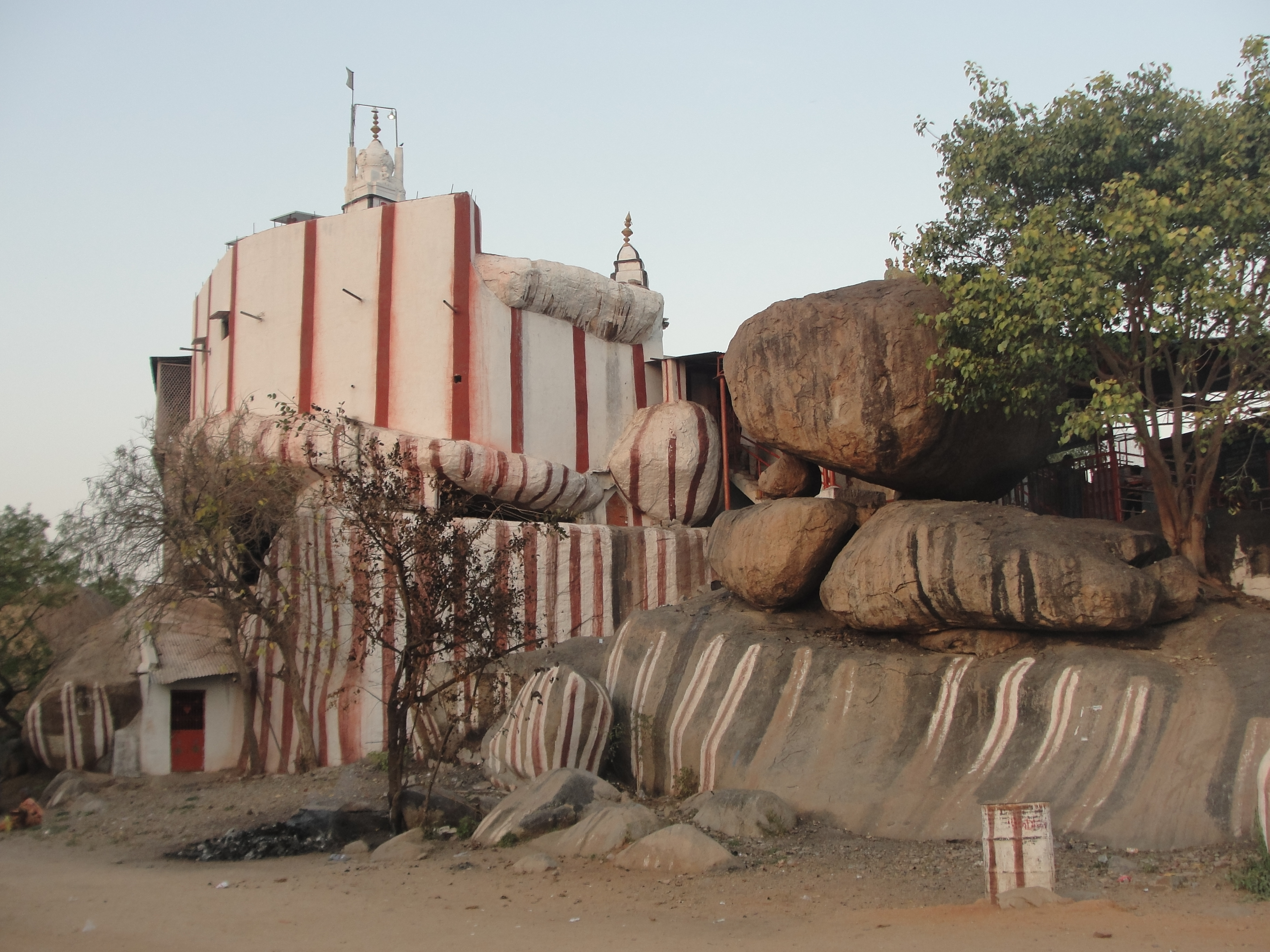
Panchamukhi Anjaneya Temple, Ganadhal, Karnataka

Ganadhal (also spelled Ganadhala) is a village near Gillesugur village in Raichur taluk, Raichur district in the Indian state of Karnataka. Ganadhal is famous for the Sri Panchamukhi Hanuman Temple where the venerated Raghavendra Swami did penance for 12 years. Ganadhal can be reached from Raichur and Mantralayam.

== Legend ==
The legends regarding this temple date back to the Ramayana epic. Having lost all his sons and commanders, the demon king Ravana summoned his step-brother Ahiravan (Mahiravana), who was adept in Maya (illusion). Hearing this, Vibhishana (Ravana's righteous brother, who had sided with Rama), warned Rama and the Vanaras. As per Rama's instruction, Hanuman built a fortress from his tail, where Rama, Lakshmana and the Vanaras were protected. The discus Sudarshana stood at the top of the fortress.

Mahiravana, who learned of this, assumed the form of Vibhishana and approached Hanuman at night, saying that he had obtained magical threads capable of protecting Rama and Lakshmana from the demons and their illusions. When an unsuspecting Hanuman let him in, he rendered Rama and Lakshmana unconscious and turning them into dolls, he escaped to his city Manivarthanapura, in Patala. When Hanuman saw the real Vibhishana standing outside, he realized what had happened and entered the fortress, only to find all the Vanaras unconscious and Rama-Lakshmana missing. Claiming that he was responsible for this situation, he decided to bring them back himself. Vibhishana informed him about the two gates to Manivarthanapura; one was in Ravana's palace and the other was in a cave in present-day Ganadhal. Hanuman went into the cave and reached Manivarthanapura, but was stopped by a dark-complexioned lady with blood-red eyes. When informed of his mission, she revealed that she was Yerukalamba, the guardian of Manivarthanapura, and allowed him in stating that Mahiravana was doomed the moment he brought Rama and Lakshmana.

As Hanuman entered, he encountered a Vanara who began fighting with him. As Hanuman was about to render the final blow, he was stopped by a damsel named Deerghadehi, who said, "Spare him, merciful one, for this Vanara is your own son! While you were building the bridge to Lanka, I drank a few drops of sweat that fell from your body, and he was born as a result. I have named him Matsyavallabha. Please bless him." Hanuman embraced his son, who asked him to approach and seek help from an Apsara named Chandrasena, who had wished to marry Lord Vishnu but had been abducted by Mahiravana. Proceeding to the southwestern part of the city, he met another damsel who was crying and calling out Rama's name. On speaking with her, he got to know that she was none other than Chandrasena. He also learnt that Mahiravana's soul, instead of being in his body, was hidden someplace, and asked her to divulge it from Mahiravana. He then met Rama and Lakshmana, who had been imprisoned in the shrine of Yerukalamba.

When Mahiravana came to meet Chandrasena, she pretended to love him and showed inclination towards marriage. When she had gotten him happy, she asked in mock concern as to what would happen if he was killed in battle. He revealed that his soul was in the form of five bees that lived under a rock near the gate to his city. He assured her that their humming was fatal, and he would die only if all five of them were killed together. On knowing this, Hanuman thanked her and went to the rock where the bees lived.

As he pondered that he could swallow and kill all five bees at once if he had five faces, a newfound strength enveloped him. He then assumed the five-headed form of Panchamukhi Hanuman. His own face faced east, while the faces of Garuda, Narasimha, Varaha and Hayagriva faced west, south, north and upwards respectively. When he swallowed the five bees at once, Mahiravana also crumpled to the ground and died. Rama, who was set free, then blessed Chandrasena, assuring that he would marry her in his subsequent births. He then crowned Neelamegha king of Manivarthanapura and ordered Matsyavallabha (Hanuman's son) to be his counselor. Hanuman also requested Yerukalamba to guard the city and then returned to the Vanara camp.

== History of the Temple ==
In the 17th century, Sri Raghavendra Swami, who had come to this place, had a vision of Panchamukhi Hanuman, Lakshmi-Venkateshwara and Kurma. By then, the place had become full of overgrown trees and was a veritable forest in itself.

A few centuries ago, there lived a devout Madhva Brahmin named Anantachar. One night, Panchamukhi Hanuman appeared to him in a dream and instructed him to worship his svayambhu murti in the forest. No matter how much he searched in the forest, Anantachar couldn't find it. The next day, a brahmin approached him and guided him to the self-manifested idol. When he was about to thank him, the brahmin was nowhere to be seen. Thinking it as divine providence, he installed the murti and began regular worship to it. His descendants, even to this day, continue to function as head priests to Lord Panchamukhi Hanuman.

== Demographics ==
As of 2001 India census, Ganadhal had a population of 4,266 with 2,149 males and 2,117 females and 758 households.

== See also ==
- Naradagadde
- Bichali
- Mantralayam
- Raichur
