= Yesvantpur–Shivamogga Town Express =

Express train in India

Overview
- Service type: Express
- First service: 16 January 2017
- Current operator: South Western Railways

Route
- Termini: Yesvantpur Junction; Shivamogga Town
- Stops: 13
- Distance travelled: 268 km (167 mi)
- Average journey time: 13 hours 15 mins
- Service frequency: Tri-Weekly
- Train number: 16581 / 16582

On-board services
- Classes: AC 1st Class, AC 2 tier, AC 3 tier, Sleeper, General
- Sleeping arrangements: Yes
- Catering facilities: No pantry car attached

Technical
- Rolling stock: LHB coach
- Track gauge: 1,676 mm (5 ft 6 in)
- Operating speed: 140 km/h (87 mph) maximum,45 km/h (28 mph), including halts

Yesvantpur–Shivamogga Town Express is an Express train belonging to South Western Railway zone of Indian Railways that run between Yesvantpur Junction and Shivamogga Town in India.

== Background ==
This train was inaugurated on 16 January 2017, Flagged off by Suresh Prabhu Former Minister of Railways for more connectivity between Bangalore and Shimoga. And it was started as KSR Bengaluru City–Shivamooga Town Express but for decongestion of Bangalore City station its terminal shifted to Yesvantpur Junction on 15 July 2017.

== Service ==
The frequency of this train is three days a week, it covers the distance of 268 km with an average speed of 45 km/h.

== Routes ==
This train passes through Arsikere Junction, Kadur Junction & Birur Junction for by passing both sides.

== Traction ==
As this route is currently going to be electrified, a WDP-4 based locomotive pulls the train to its destination on both sides. Earlier was WDM-3A
