= Mathighatta =

Mathighatta may refers to the following places in Karnataka, India:

- Mathighatta, Bhadravati, a village in Bhadravati Taluk, Shimoga district
- Mathighatta, Chiknayakanhalli, a village in Chiknayakanhalli Taluk, Tumakuru district
- Mathighatta, Gubbi, a village in Gubbi Taluk, Tumakuru district
- Mathighatta, Hassan, a village in Belur Taluk, Hassan district
- Mathighatta, Mandya, a village in Krishnarajpet Taluk, Mandya district
- Mathighatta, Shikarpur, a village in Shikarpur Taluk, Shimoga district
