= Ganjigatte =

Coordinates: 14°14′N 76°07′E

- Interactive map of Ganjigatte

Ganjigatte is a village in Holalkere tehsil, Chitradurga district of the Indian state of Karnataka.

== Geography ==
It is one of 202 villages in Holalkere Block. Nearby villages are Udogere to east, Garahalli in the west, Muthugadur in the south and Ganjigatte Lambani Hatte in north west. The nearest railway station is Sasalu, 2.5 km away. Bus service is available 1–2 km from village,

== Demographics ==
According to Census 2011 the population is about 1032 persons living in around 250 households.

== Education ==
The coeducational village school enrolls primary and upper primary students. It opened in 1952. The Head Master Kuberappa. Instruction is in Kannada and English.
