= Adrikatte =

Coordinates: 13°45′N 76°10′E

- village
- Adrikatte is in Chitradurga district
- Interactive map of Adrikatte
- Country: India
- State: Karnataka
- District: Chitradurga
- Talukas: Hosadurga

Government
  - Body: Village Panchayat

Languages
  - Official: Kannada
- Time zone: UTC+5:30 (IST)
- Nearest city: Chitradurga
- Civic agency: Village Panchayat

Adrikatte is a village in the southern state of Karnataka, India. It is located in the Hosadurga taluk of Chitradurga district in Karnataka. At the 2011 census, the population was 1,280.

== See also ==
- Chitradurga
- Districts of Karnataka
