= Talikatti =

- village
- Location in Karnataka, India Talikatti (India)
- Coordinates: 14.05°N 76.18°E
- Country: India
- State: Karnataka
- District: Chitradurga
- Talukas: Holalkere

Population (2001)
  - Total: 5,573

Languages
  - Official: Kannada
- Time zone: UTC+5:30 (IST)

Talikatti is a village in the southern state of Karnataka, India. It is located in the Holalkere taluk of Chitradurga district in Karnataka.

== Demographics ==
As of 2001 India census, Talikatti had a population of 5573 inhabitants with 2884 males and 2689 females.

== See also ==
- Chitradurga
- Districts of Karnataka
