= Abradasikatte =

Coordinates: 14°04′N 76°05′E

- village
- Abradasikatte is in Chitradurga district
- Interactive map of Abradasikatte
- Country: India
- State: Karnataka
- District: Chitradurga
- Talukas: Holalkere

Government
  - Body: Village Panchayat

Languages
  - Official: Kannada
- Time zone: UTC+5:30 (IST)
- Nearest city: Chitradurga
- Civic agency: Village Panchayat

Abradasikatte is a village in the southern state of Karnataka, India. It is located in the Holalkere taluk of Chitradurga district in Karnataka.

== See also ==
- Chitradurga
- Districts of Karnataka
