= Bichali =

Bichhali Bichchali
- village
- Location in Karnataka, India Bichhali (India)
- Coordinates: 15°57′22″N 77°19′4″E
- Country: India
- State: Karnataka
- District: Raichur
- Taluk: Raichur

Population (2001)
  - Total: 3,096

Languages
  - Official: Kannada
- Time zone: UTC+5:30 (IST)
- PIN: 584 140
- Vehicle registration: KA-36

Tungabhadra river near Bichali, Karnataka

Bichali, also spelled as Bichchali or Bichal, is a village near Gillesugur village in the Raichur taluk of Raichur district in the Indian state of Karnataka. It is located on the banks of Tungabhadra river. In ancient times, it was known as Bhikshalaya. Madhwa scholar and follower of Raghavendra Swami, Appanacharya was born in the village. He belonged to a family of landlords with large tract of land holdings inherited from his father. He established a gurukula for students at this place then called Japadikatte. Appanacharya family belongs to Uttaradi Matha but he was a great devotee of Raghavendra Swami. Raghavendra Swami stayed with his bhakta Appanacharya at Bichali for 13 years doing penance and preaching his philosophy.

== Geography ==
Bichali is an ancient village, known by many names in olden times such as Gillesugur, Bhiskhalaya, also as Bichali Japadakatti, and Anu Mantralaya (mini Mantralaya) in the Raichur district of Karnataka, which is located on the bank of the Tungabhadra river. Located on the river side, the village, flood prone, with scenic surroundings has lush green paddy fields, river spots, rocky hillocks, and sleepy hamlets.This village now houses many holy shrines and is popular pilgrim centre.

== History ==
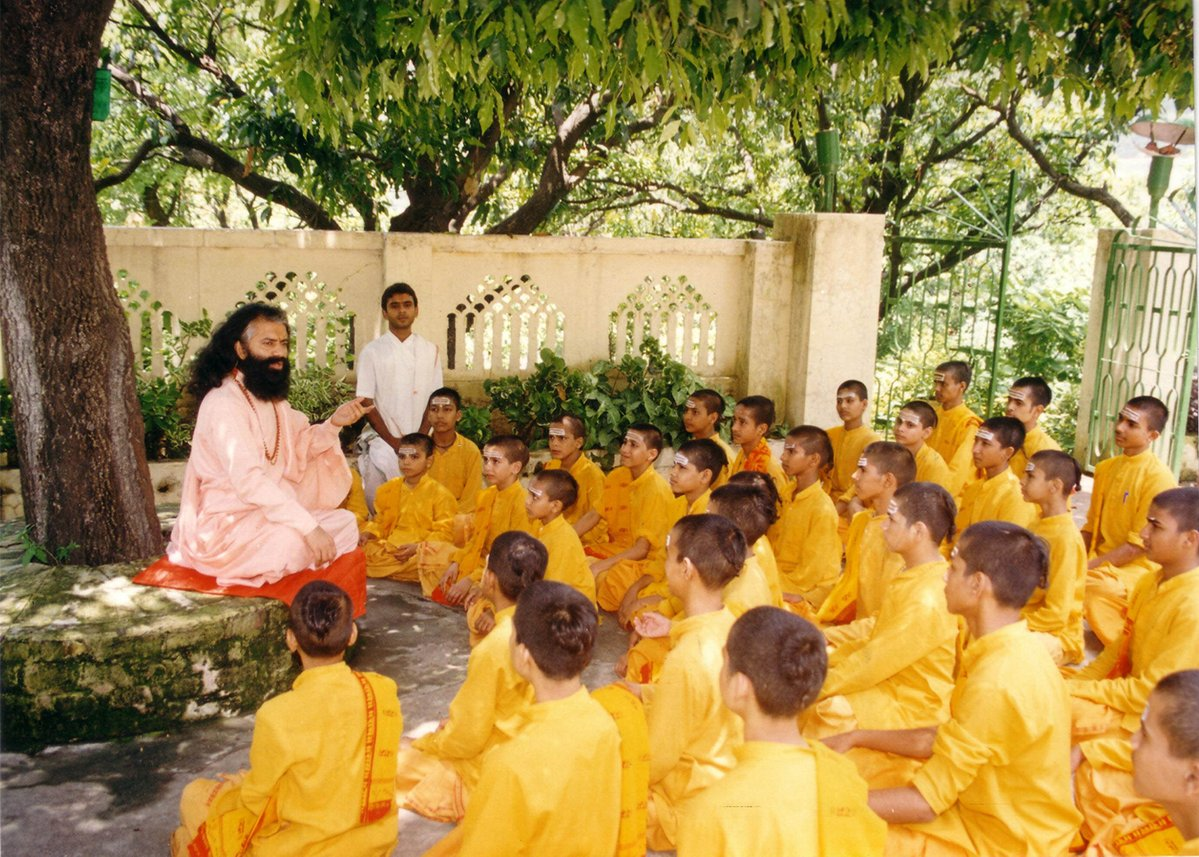
A typical gurukula

Over the centuries during the times of saint Raghavendra Swami (also known as Rayaru), who promoted Dwaita philosophy, it became a prominent centre for gurukula education established by the saintly and erudite scholar Sri Appanachary born in Bichali, who was the son of a rich land lord Ramasubbanachar, who owned 20 villages as Jagir and 300 acres (120 ha) of fertile land. This was once known as Japadakatti and a traditional gurukula, an open university, which was established by Appanacharya on the shores of Tungabhadra river under an Ashwath Vruksha (Sacred fig (Ficus religiosa) tree). The mystic saint of Mantralaya, Raghavendra Swamy, had established a close bond with his contemporary and disciple Appanacharya and stayed with him for 13 years doing penance at Bichali Japada katte; Appanacharya was then 60 years old and two years elder to Raghavendra Swami (usually addressed as Rayaru). Appanacharya's house was considered a house of divinity as Rayaru stayed there, performing the pooja of Sri Moola Rama Devaru in the central hall of the house where he also used to sleep.

Pleased with the Appanacharay's devotional service in running the Gurukula, Rayaru gifted 12 acres (4.9 ha) of land located in Kaldakuntla, 12 kilometres (7.5 mi) from Mantralaya. Initially, Appanacharya protested as he was already a rich landlord, but Rayaru forced him to accept the land.

Appanacharya, as an ardent devotee of Raghavendra Swami, also composed a hymn or chant in honour of his guru called Raghavendra stotra, Sanskrit hymns, which begins with : "Sri poojyaya Raghavendraya ...", which is a constant hymn (stotra of 32 hymns) recited by the devotees of saint Ragahavendar Swamy of Mantralaya as a community prayer.-

The deities of Hanuman and Ugra Narasimha consecrated by seers Vysaraja and Sripadaraja, respectively, are located at an elevated river spot at Japadakatti.

Much later, following the voluntary samadhi of Sri Raghavendra Swami at Mantralaya, Appanacharya established a Brindavana, a memorial, an open air shrine to mark the 13 years stay of the saint in Bichali in the form of a monolithic stone (ekashile).

== Sacred places ==
Over the long period of involvement by Appanacharya and his guru Raghavendra, many sacred places were established which have become popular as pilgrimage centres for spiritual devotees. Some of these are: Nagakatti, Sri Narasimhagudi, the Brindavana memorial for saint Raghavendra, and the house of Appannacharya; the last named house is where Ragahavendra Swami had stayed with Appanacharya for 13 years and performed long Mool Ramara poojas (worship of Rama) regularly for the welfare of the villagers. During Nagarapanchami festival devotees offer worship at the Japadakatti Nagadevaru at Nagakatti which was once worshipped by the saint Sri Jitramitra. Seshadevaru, meaning the holy deity of snake god, consecrated by Gururayaru Raghavendra, is also seen at the Bichali Japadakatti.

== See also ==
- Naradagadde
- Mantralayam
- Raichur
