= Banasihalli =

Coordinates: 13°54′N 76°18′E

- village
- Interactive map of Banasihalli
- Country: India
- State: Karnataka

Languages
  - Official: Kannada
- Time zone: UTC+5:30 (IST)

Banasihalli is a small village in Hosadurga Taluk of Chitradurga district, Karnataka state, India. It is around 15 km from Hosadurga. Population is around 1000 and agriculture is the main occupation. Coconut and Arecanut are main agricultural products. The place is surrounded by rocky mountains. Lingayat is the main caste of people. There is a government primary school for education. The place is well connected to Hosadurga and Chitradurga by buses.
