= R.Nulenuru =

- city
- Location in Karnataka, India
- Coordinates: 14.042°N 76.184°E
- Country: India
- State: Karnataka
- District: Chitradurga

Area
  - Total: 12.2 km^{2} (4.7 sq mi)
- Elevation: 710 m (2,330 ft)

Population (2001)
  - Total: 14,574
  - Density: 1,194.59/km^{2} (3,094.0/sq mi)

Languages
  - Official: Kannada
- Time zone: UTC+5:30 (IST)
- PIN: 577 526
- Telephone code: 08191
- Vehicle registration: KA-16

R.Nulenuru is a village in Holalkere Taluk, near Chitradurga in the Indian state of Karnataka.
