= Gunderi =

- Village
- Location in Karnataka, India Gunderi (India)
- Coordinates: 13.9944°N 76.1844°E
- Country: India
- State: Karnataka
- District: Chitradurga

Government
  - Body: Gram panchayat

Languages
  - Official: Kannada
- Time zone: UTC+5:30 (IST)
- PIN: 577 526
- Telephone code: 08191
- ISO 3166 code: IN-KA
- Vehicle registration: KA-16
- Website: karnataka.gov.in

Gunderi is a village in the southern state of Karnataka, India. It is located in the Holalkere taluk of Chitradurga district in Karnataka.

== Nearest districts to Gunderi ==
Gunderi is located around 35 km away from its district headquarters of Chitradurga. The other nearest district headquarters is Davanagere situated at 58 km distance from Gunderi. Surrounding districts from Gunderi are as follows:

- Davanagere district 58 km.
- Shimoga district 75 km.
- Hassan district 110 km.
- Chikmagalur district 116 km.

== Transport ==
The nearest railway station to Gunderi is Holalkere which is around 6.5 km away. Other nearby stations include:

- Ramgiri railway station 6.8 km.
- Chikjajur Jn railway station 15.2 km.
- Hosdurga Road railway station 23.6 km.
- Shivani railway station 24.0 km.
