= Vani Vilasa Sagara =

- Vani Vilasa Sagara Dam in Karnataka
- Location: Hosadurga Taluk, Chitradurga district, Karnataka
- Coordinates: 13°53′26″N 76°28′37″E

Dam and spillways
- Impounds: Vedavathi River

Vāni Vilāsa Sāgara (VVS), popularly known as Māri Kanive Dam is a reservoir constructed across Vedavathi river in Hosadurga Taluk, Chitradurga District, in the Indian state of Karnataka. It is located about 24 km northeast of Hosadurga, 20 km west of Hiriyur, 55 km south of Chitradurga, and 180 km northwest of Bengaluru.

Vani Vilasa Sagara is the oldest and continuously operating dam in the state, completed its construction in August 1907. The dam irrigates a large area of the Deccan region of Central Karnataka, which is otherwise largely a dry land. It irrigates more than 100 km^{2} of land in Hiriyur taluk through right and left bank canals. Vani Vilasa Sagara dam is also the source of domestic water for Hiriyur, Hosadurga, Chitradurga and Challakere taluks.

== History ==
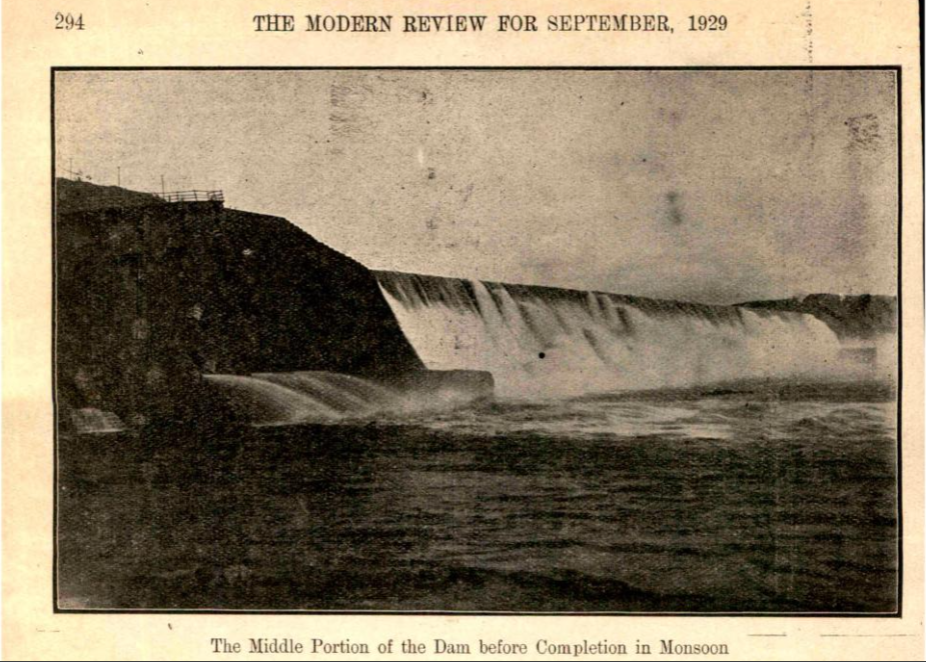
The dam during construction

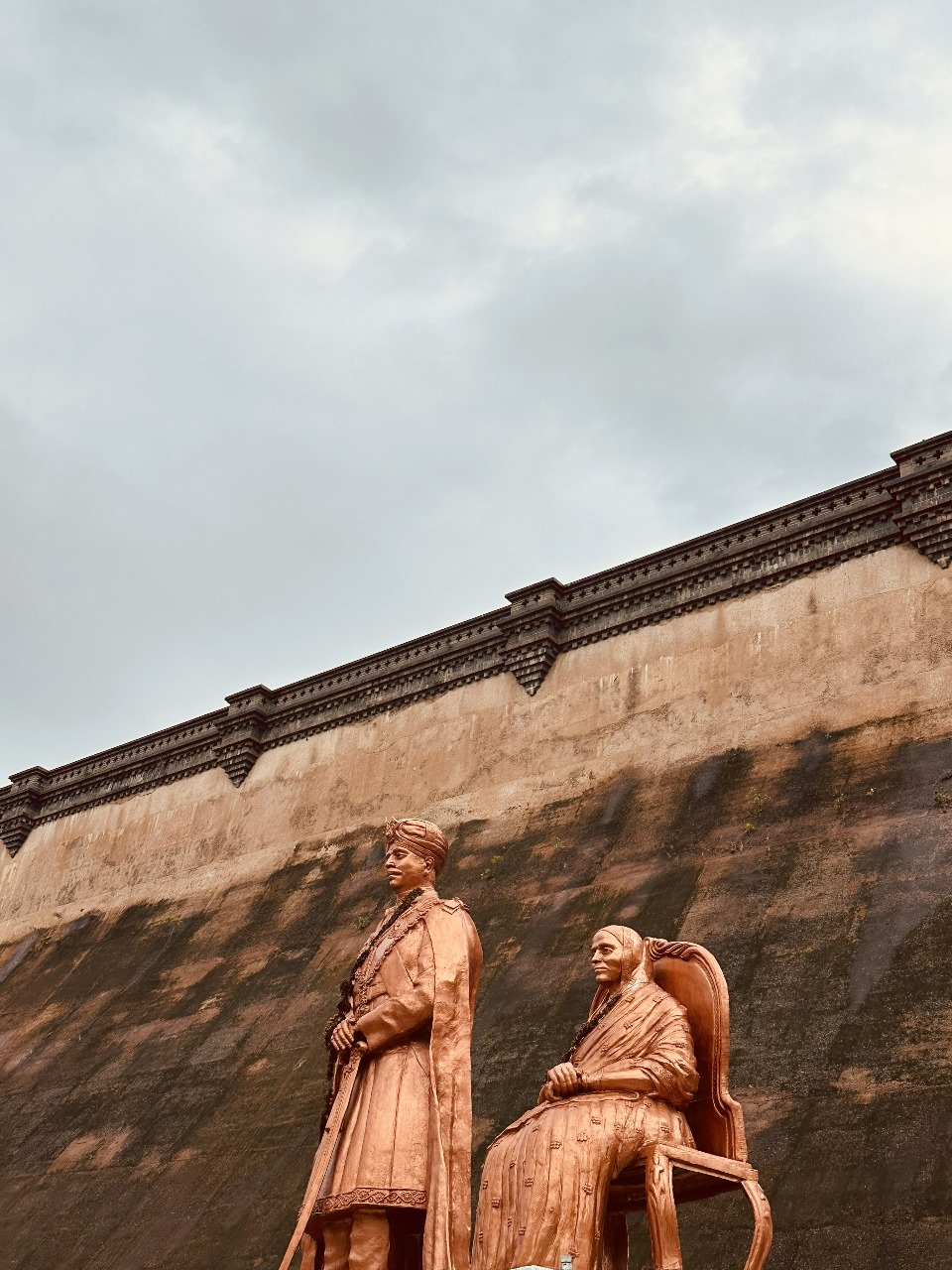
Statues of Krishnaraja Wadiyar (son, standing) and Kempananjammanni Devi (mother, sitting) in front of the Dam

In 1803, Scottish botanist Francis Buchanan observed that Mari Kanive had potential as a reservoir site during his visit to the region. The location takes its name from the nearby Kanive Maramma temple.

Sir Mark Cubbon proposed constructing a dam across the valley at Mari Kanive in the early 19th century, but serious planning and implementation didn't begin until around 1897.

Dewan K. Seshadri Iyer initiated the Mari Kanive irrigation project under the authority of Queen Kempananjammanni Devi Vani Vilasa Sannidhana. Iyer established a committee in 1897 and conducted a personal inspection of the site in 1898 before approving construction. The dam took nine years to complete, though Iyer passed away before its completion in 1907.

The reservoir was named after Queen Kempananjammanni Devi in recognition of her administrative position. A widely circulated story claims that the Queen sold or pledged her jewellery to fund either the VV Sagara dam or KRS dam. However, despite being repeated in many articles and popular accounts, no primary source documentation supports this claim.

Sir M. Visvesvaraya is sometimes incorrectly credited with the dam's 1907 completion. Visvesvaraya, who later became Chief Engineer and Dewan of Mysore, did not join the service until 1909. His contributions were focused on developing the irrigation system after the dam's construction.

== Features ==
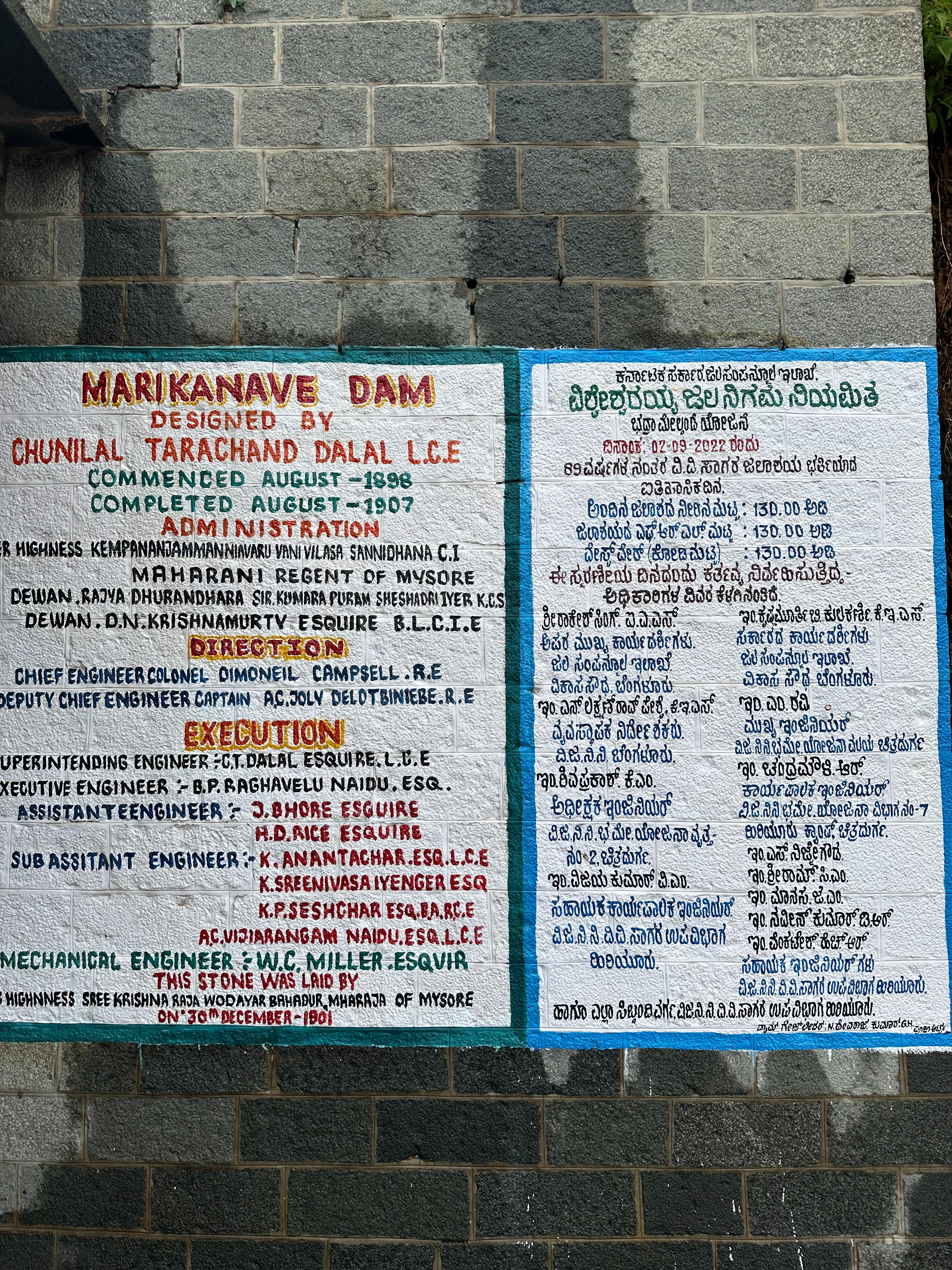
Key facts on the wall, dated 14th July 2025

=== Structure and capacity ===
The dam is capable of storing 30 tmcft of water. It is 1,330 feet long and 145 feet high. The full reservoir level (FRL) is 130 feet, reaching up on which the overflow duct spills the extra water by the side of the dam. The dam crossed 120 feet mark numerous times, namely in 1932, 1934, 1956, 1957, 1958, 2000, 2021 and 2022. The dam reached the overflow levels only 4 times, first at 1933 and in recent year in 2022 and 2025.

=== Architecture ===
The VVS Dam features two prominent pavilion halls built in the Indo-Saracenic style of architecture.

== Upper Bhadra Project ==
Due to insufficient water quantity in the reservoir, to cater the drinking and irrigation needs of people in Chitradurga district and eastern part of Chikkamagaluru district, the Government of Karnataka, has made a milestone project called Upper-Bhadra project. As per the project, out of 17 TMC ft. of water lifted from Tunga Gajanur Dam and 29.90 TMC ft. of water lifted from Bhadra Dam, 2 tmcft is exclusively allotted to this dam.

== Tourism ==
In 2022, then Chief Minister of Karnataka, Basavaraj Bommai announced funding for modernisation and improvement of the canals, irrigations as well as promoting the tourist place with creating of a garden.

General Thimayya National Academy of Adventure, part of department of youth empowerment and sports of Karnataka, has set up an adventure camp near the reservoir for water sports.

In 2025, the state tourism department announced new attractions at Vani Vilasa Sagara. Tourism Minister H. K. Patil said that from November 2025 the reservoir would host a variety of water sports, with full facilities for boating, kayaking, jet-skiing, banana-boat rides, windsurfing and sailing. He proposed a new Karnataka State Tourism Development Corporation (KSTDC) “Mayura” hotel to accommodate visitors.

== Gallery ==
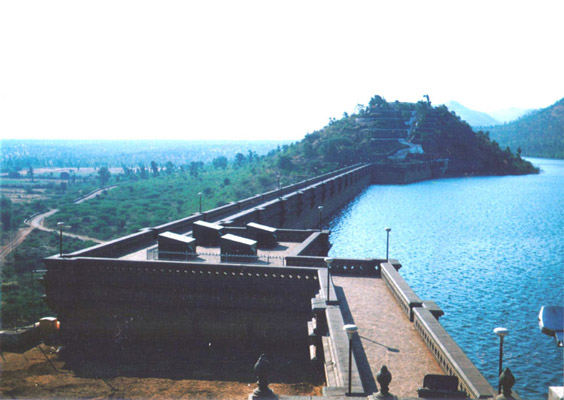
Sep. 2004

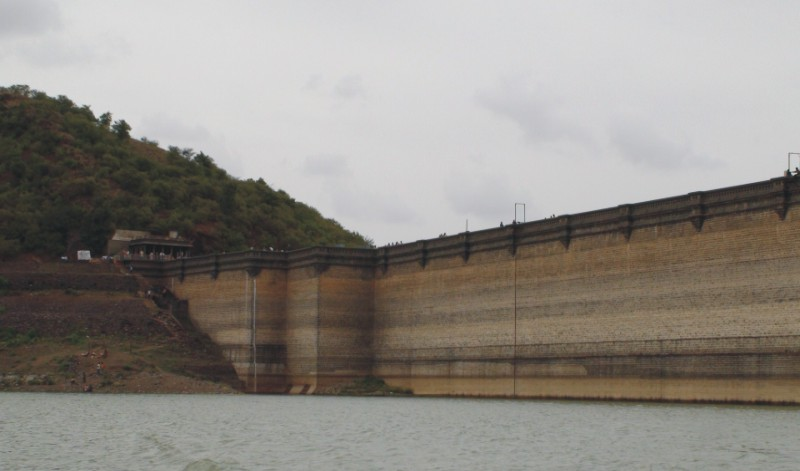
View from the waterside, March 2010

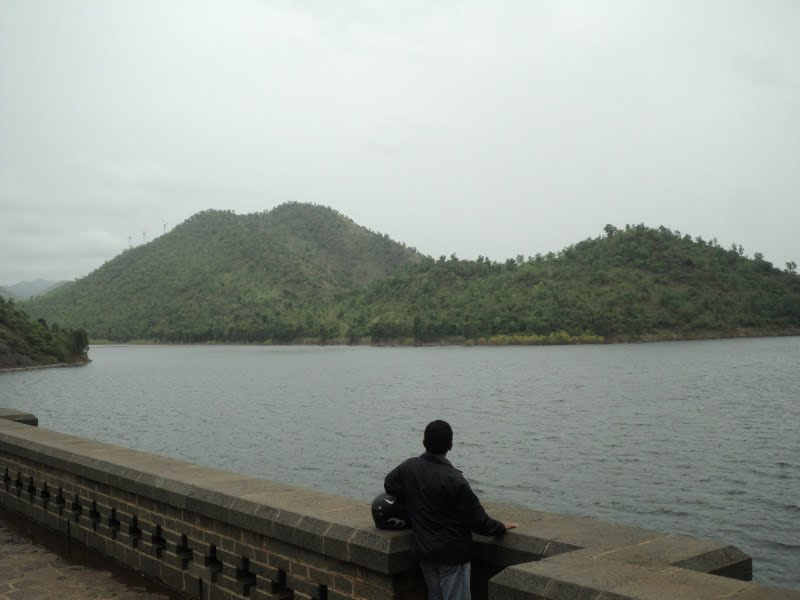
Overlooking the hills. June 2011

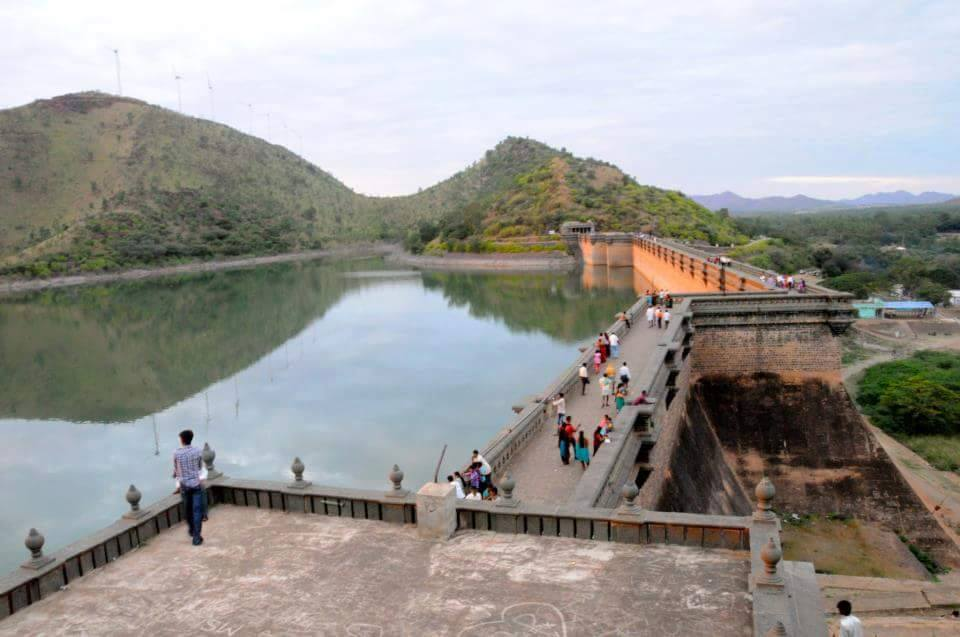
March 2015
