= State Highway 24 (Karnataka) =

Road in Karnataka, India

State Highway 24

Route information
- Maintained by Karnataka Road Development Corporation Limited
- Length: 139.61 km (86.75 mi)

Major junctions
- West end: Tarikere
- East end: Chirathehalli

Location
- Country: India
- State: Karnataka
- Districts: Chikkamagaluru, Chitradurga, Tumakuru
- Primary destinations: Tarikere, Hosadurga, Hiriyur

Highway system
- Roads in India; Expressways; National; State; Asian; State Highways in Karnataka

State Highway 24, also known as SH-24 and popularly known as Tarikere - Hiriyur Road (TH Road) is a state highway connecting Tarikere town of Chikmagalur district to Chirathehalli village of Tumkur district (Andra border), in the south Indian state of Karnataka.

== Details ==
It has a total length of 139.61 kilometres (86.75 mi).

Major towns and villages (west to east) on SH-24 are: Tarikere, Bettadavarekere, Maakanahalli, Sokke, Ajjampura, Gowrapura, Beguru, Antharagatte, Neeragunda, Bokikere, Hosadurga, Hunavinadu, Masanihalli, MaDadahalli, Sheeranakatte, Lakkihalli, Kambadahalli, Koonikere, Yaradakatte, Huchchhavvana halli, Mykalurahalli, Hiriyur, Babburu, Byadarahalli, Eshwaragere, Abbinahole, T.Gollahalli, Dharmapura, Amani-talab, Bejjihalli and Chirathehalli.
