= Raghavendra (disambiguation) =

Raghavendra usually refers to Raghavendra Tirtha (1595–1671), an Indian Hindu saint.

Raghavendra may also refer to:

== Arts and entertainment ==
- Raghavendra stotra, hymn composed by Appanacharya in praise of Raghavendra Tirtha
- Sri Raghavendrar, 1985 Indian Tamil-language film by S. P. Muthuraman about Raghavendra Tirtha
- Raghavendra (film), 2003 Indian Telugu-language film by Suresh Krishna

== People ==
- Kovelamudi Raghavendra Rao (born 23 May 1942), Indian director in Telugu cinema
- Raghavendra Rajkumar, Indian actor in Kannada cinema
- Raghavendra Gadagkar, professor at the Centre for Ecological Sciences, Indian Institute of Science in Bangalore

== Other ==
- Raghavendra Matha, a Madhva Matha based in Mantralayam
