= Malladihalli =

Coordinates: 14°02′N 76°05′E

Malladihalli is a village in the taluk of Holalkere in the Chitradurga district in the Indian state of Karnataka.
