= Wodeyar Express =

Train in India

The Wodeyar Superfast Express (formerly Tippu Express) is a Superfast Express train running between K. S. R Bengaluru and Mysuru in India. It covers a distance of 139 km in 2.5 hours with two stops, one at Mandya and another at a suburb in Bengaluru, Kengeri. South Western Railway launched an information and entertainment system, "Infotainment on Wheels", on the Wodeyar Express. The new infotainment system allows commuters on board to get real-time information on the arrival and departure of trains and view daily news, weather and entertainment. . It is the fastest train between Mysuru and Bengaluru and vice versa.

== Name ==
This train was started on 15 April 1980 as "Tippu Express" after Tipu Sultan who ruled the Kingdom of Mysuru and died at the Siege of Seringapatam in 1799. The train was renamed on 7 October 2022, after the royal family of Mysuru, the Wodeyars.

== Rake sharing ==
It shares its rake with the Siddhaganga Intercity Express & the KSR Bengaluru–Talaguppa Intercity Express.

Day 1 – 12613>20651 Day 2 – 20652>12725 Day 3 – 12726>12614

== Timing ==
This train leaves Mysuru at 11:30 hrs & reaches Bengaluru at 14:00 hrs and in the opposite direction, leaves Bengaluru at 15:00 hrs & reaches Mysuru at 17:30 hrs. Previously the train used to depart Mysuru Junction at 11:00 hrs and reach KSR Bengaluru at 13:30 hrs, with the only stop at Mandya. Nowadays, it's reaching Mysuru between 17.15 and 17.30, as the doubling of tracks is completed on this route.

== Schedule ==
=== 12613 ===
Runs daily

Station code	Departure station	Departure time	Distance	Day
MYS	Mysuru Junction	11:30 AM	0 (Source)	Day 1
MYA	Mandya	12:08 PM	45	Day 1
KGI	Kengeri	1:18 PM	127	Day 1
SBC	KSR Bengaluru	2:00 PM	139 (Destination)	Day 1

=== 12614 ===
Runs daily

Station code	Departure station	Departure time	Distance	Day
SBC	KSR Bengaluru	3:00 PM	0 (Source)	Day 1
KGI	Kengeri	3:17 PM	13	Day 1
MYA	Mandya	4:24 PM	93	Day 1
MYS	Mysuru Junction	5:30 PM	139 (Destination)	Day 1

== Locomotive ==
Originally, this train ran with WDP-4B. Now it is currently powered by WAG-9 or WAP-7 locomotive from Krishnarajapuram Loco Shed with LHB rakes equipped.

== Gallery ==
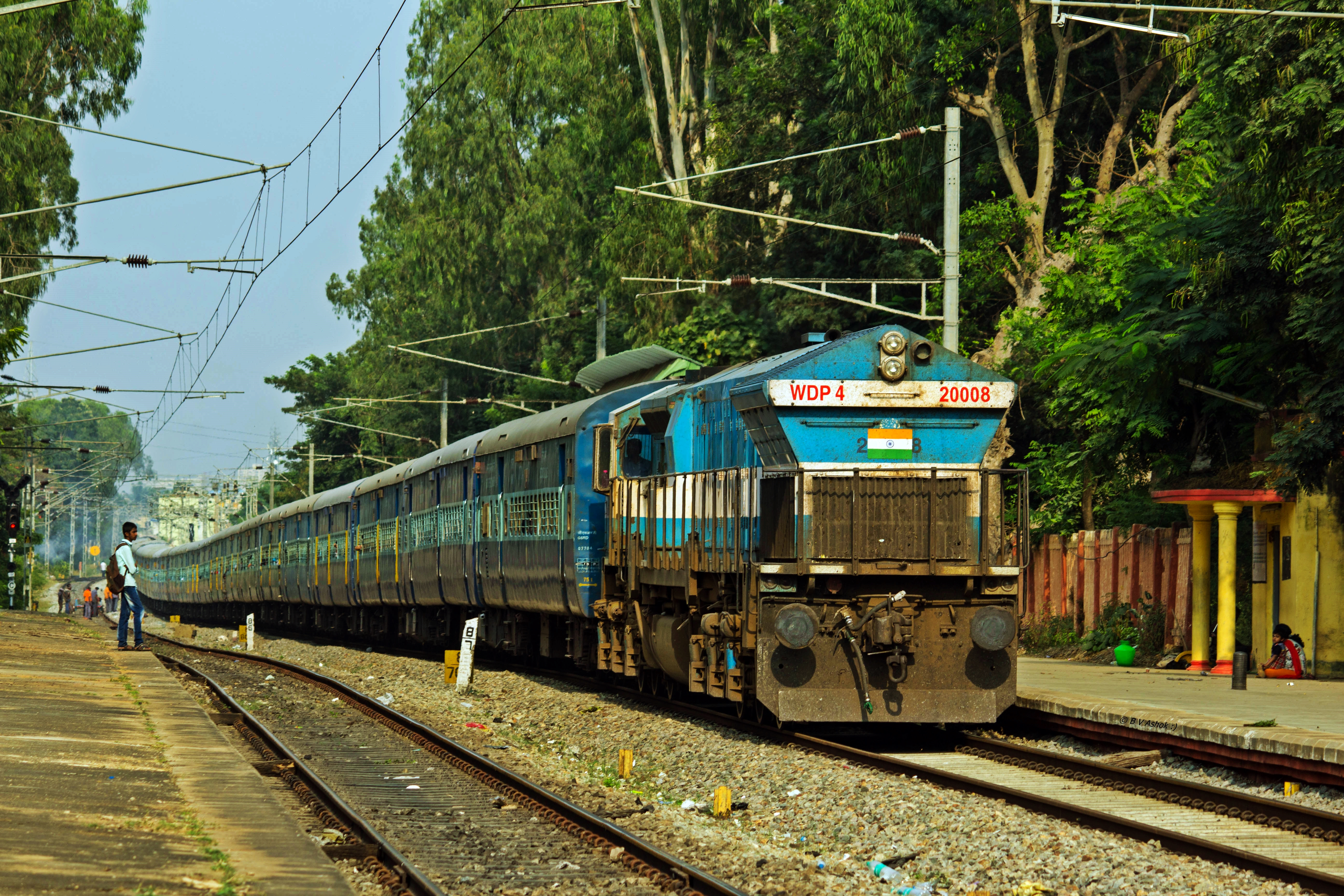

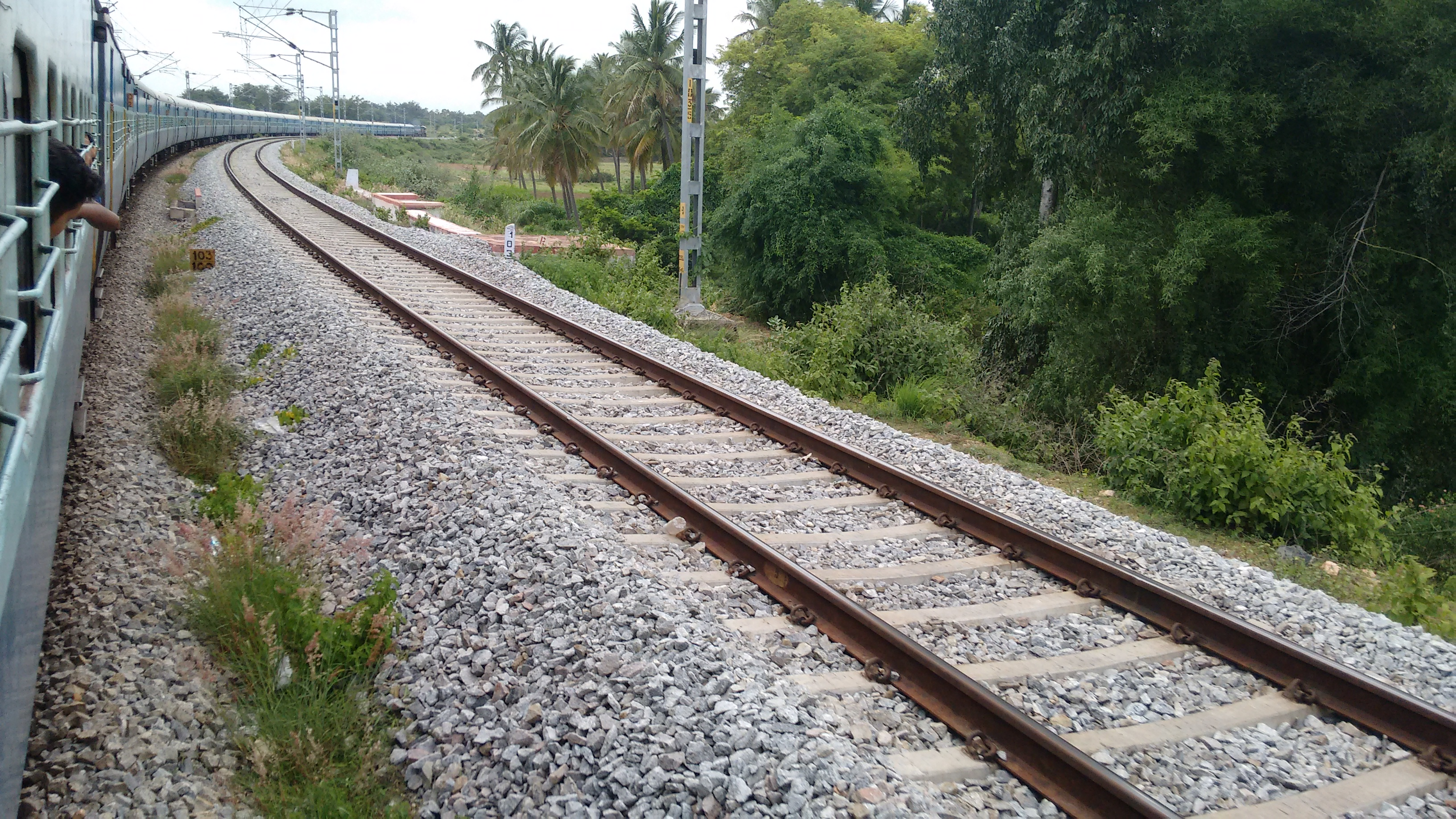

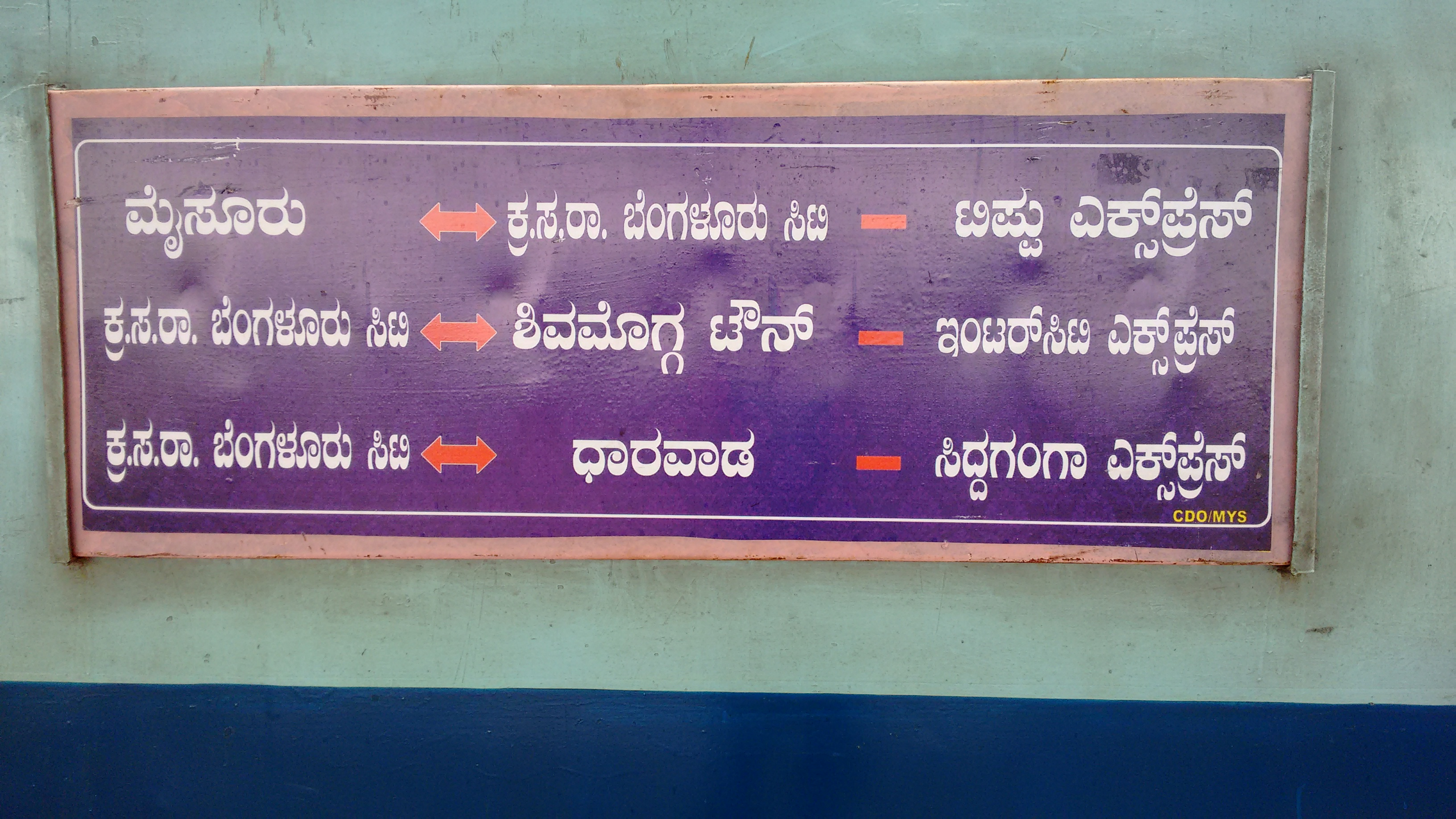

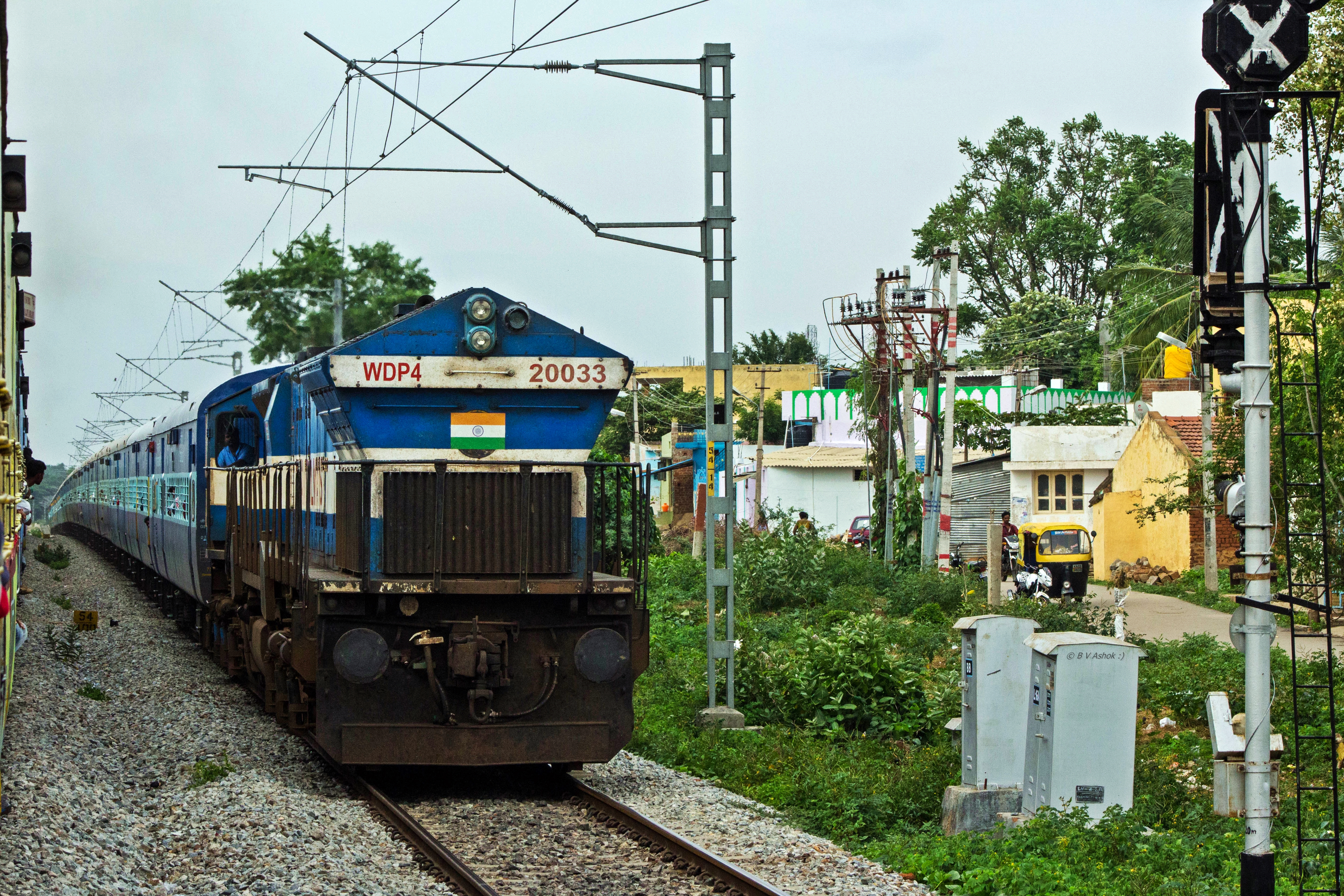

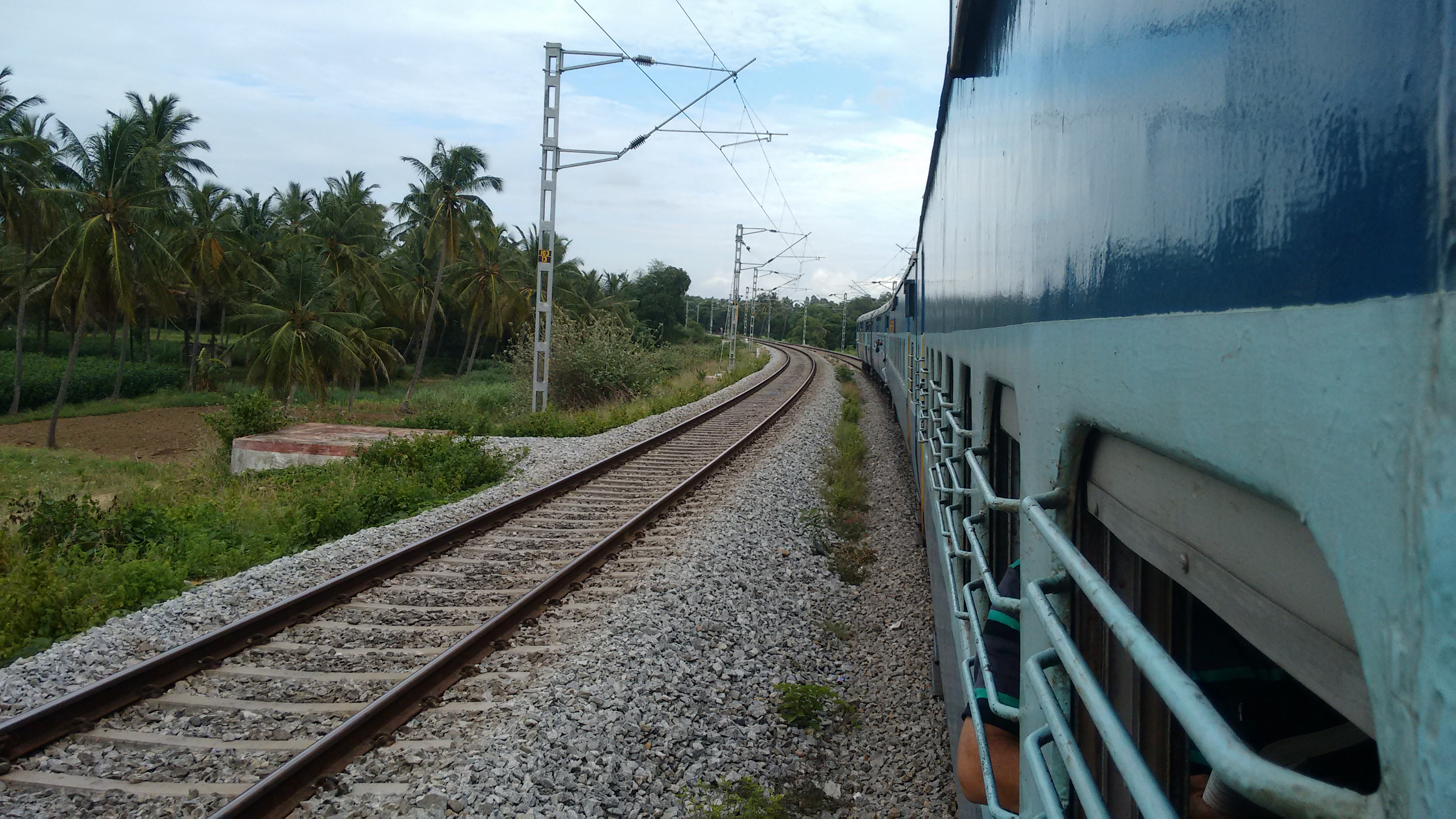
