= Chowlahiriyur =

- Village
- Location in Karnataka, India Chowlahiriyur (India)
- Coordinates: 13.687104°N 76.201693°E
- Country: India
- State: Karnataka
- District: Chikmagalur
- Region: Bayaluseeme
- Talukas: Kadur

Government
  - Body: Grama panchayat

Area
  - Total: 16.30 km^{2} (6.29 sq mi)
- Elevation: 720 m (2,360 ft)

Population (2011)
  - Total: 4,236
  - Density: 259.9/km^{2} (673.1/sq mi)

Languages
  - Official: Kannada
- Time zone: UTC+5:30 (IST)
- PIN: 577180
- Telephone code: 08267
- Vehicle registration: KA-66
- Lok Sabha constituency: Hassan Lok Sabha constituency
- Climate: Dry (Köppen)

Chowlahiriyur is a village and a hobli in Ajjampura taluk (transl. county) of Chikmagalur district, in the state of Karnataka, India.

== Demographics ==
As per India's 2011 census, Chowlahiriyur had a population of 4,236; its location code number is 609418.

=== Religion ===
The population of Chowlahiriyur has proportionally much more Hindus to Muslims than other locales in Chikmagalur.

==== Religious activities and festivals ====
The Deviramma Temple Festival, an annual festival within Chikmagalur that takes place upon the second day of Diwali atop Deviramma Beṭṭa, is 99.5 kilometres from Chowlahiriyur.

=== Language ===
Kannada is the main spoken language. Urdu is also spoken by the Muslim community. A few families speak Tamil. English, Hindi, Telugu and Marathi are the lingua francas, per usual of Karnataka.

== Administration ==
=== Public facilities ===
Facilities include a government primary health centre, public library, APMC market, Samudaya bhavana and Grama panchayat. Karnataka bank has a branch in the village.

== Economy ==
Agriculture is the main occupation, which is mainly dependent on rainfall. Important crops are ragi, jowar, oil seeds, horse gram, green gram, onion and green chilly. Coconut is an important plantation crop.

Over the past few decades a considerable amount of the population have moved out of the village to larger cities.

Many people work in government offices and private sectors. Among all government jobs, teacher is the most sought after among students because of its short duration and less fees compared to other professional courses.

== Places of worship ==
Shree Someshwara temple in the heart of the village which was renovated in 2000 and it is mainly worshiped by lingayath community. Every year Dasara Festival celebrated. JAMPA is the important festival celebrated once in 5 years.

There is a famous Shree Bhoga nanjundeshwara temple, situated in the heart of the city, is mainly worshipped by the Kuruba community. Yearly once karthika festival is done by the kurubas, it is the main important festival of this village and 12 yearly once 9 days jathra mahothsava is done by kurubas. It also a very important festival in this village.

There is an old temple that was built in the period of Hoysalas called as Chowdammana gudi or horala(horagala) gudi. Under the name of development, the whole interior walls have been changed to granite and the original walls of ancient time have been destroyed.

Also having *Shree Banashankari Devi* temple, situated in the centre of the village and it is mainly worshiped by Devanga community. Banada hunnime is the famous festival grand celebrated by Devanga community in every year and also celebrate noolu hunnime festival.
