= Bharmannaikanadurga =

Bharamanna nayakanadurga, also known as B Durga, is a village in Holalkere taluk of Karnataka, India.

The village is served by a railway line. Bharamanna nayakanadurga is a place known historically as Bharamanna nayaka (called Bichugatti Bharamannanayaka) who ruled the region as early as 1455. He is the close relative of Madakari Nayaka who ruled Chitradurga during that period. Bharamannanayakanadurga later on emerged as the market Resource centre for surrounding regions there.

The main attraction of this town is 500-year-old Temple of Lord Sri Ekanatheshwari. This temple was established by Bharamanna Nayaka (Ruler of B Durga Region).
