= Mathighatta, Chiknayakanhalli =

Village in Karnataka, India

Mathighatta
- Village
- Location within Karnataka Location within India
- Coordinates: 13°18′39″N 76°54′03″E
- Country: India
- State: Karnataka
- District: Tumkur
- Taluk: Chiknayakanhalli

Government
  - Type: Gram Panchayat

Area
  - Total: 9.56 km^{2} (3.69 sq mi)
- Elevation: 783 m (2,569 ft)

Population (2011)
  - Total: 1,843
  - Density: 193/km^{2} (499/sq mi)

Language
  - Official: Kannada
- Time zone: UTC+5:30 (IST)
- PIN: 572219
- STD code: 08133
- Vehicle registration: KA-06

Mathighatta is a village in Chikkanayakahalli Taluk, Tumkur District, Karnataka, India. It is situated along the Karnataka State Highway 73, about 24 kilometres west of the district seat Tumkur, and 33 kilometres southeast of the taluk seat Chikkanayakana Halli. As of 2011, the village had a population of 1,843.

== Geography ==
Mathighatta lies to the north of Kadaba Lake. The Pathre Mathighatta Lake is located on the north of the village. The village covers an area of 956.42 hectares.

== Demographics ==
According to the 2011 India Census, there were 503 households within Mathighatta. Out of the local population, 907 are male and 936 are female. The average literacy rate was 69.07%, with 677 of the male inhabitants and 596 of the female inhabitants being literate.
