= KSR Bengaluru–Talaguppa Intercity Express =

KSR Bengaluru - Talaguppa Intercity Express
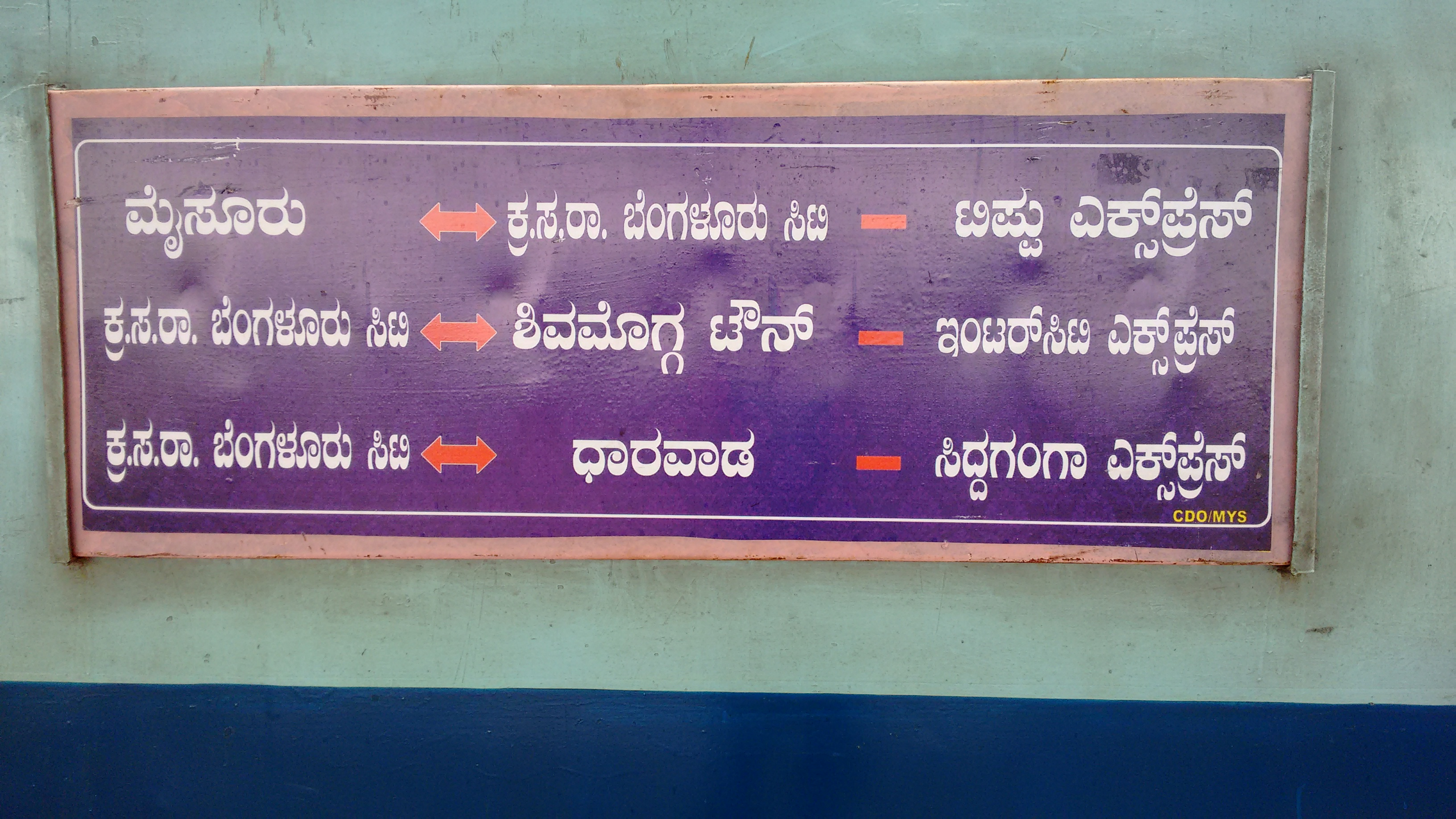
- Train board

Overview
- Service type: Superfast
- First service: 8 December 2009; 16 years ago
- Current operator: South Western Railway zone

Route
- Termini: KSR Bengaluru; Talaguppa
- Stops: 16
- Distance travelled: 371 km (231 mi)
- Average journey time: 7 hours 10 mins
- Service frequency: Daily
- Train number: 20651 / 20652

On-board services
- Classes: general unreserved, AC chair car, Chair car
- Seating arrangements: Yes
- Sleeping arrangements: No
- Catering facilities: No

Technical
- Rolling stock: Standard Indian Railways LHB Coaches
- Track gauge: Indian Broad Gauge
- Operating speed: 56 km/h (35 mph)

The 20651 / 20652 KSR Bengaluru – Talaguppa Intercity Express is a Superfast train belonging to Indian Railways South Western Railway zone that runs between KSR Bengaluru and Talaguppa in India.

It operates as train number 20651 from KSR Bengaluru to Talaguppa and as train number 20652 in the reverse direction serving the state of Karnataka.

== Coaches ==
The 20651 / 52 KSR Bengaluru - Talaguppa Intercity Express has one AC chair car, Eight Chair car, 8 general unreserved One SLR (seating with luggage rake) and One EOG coaches . It does not carry a pantry car coach.

As is customary with most train services in India, coach composition may be amended at the discretion of Indian Railways depending on demand.

== Service ==
The 20651 Bangalore City – Talaguppa Intercity Express covers the distance of 371 km (231 mi) in 7 hours 15 mins (52 km/h) and in 7 hours 5 mins as the 20652 Shimoga Town - Bangalore City Intercity Express (51 km/h).

As the average speed of the train is more than 55 km/h (34 mph), as per railway rules, its fare includes a Superfast surcharge.

== Routing ==
The 20651 / 52 Bangalore City – Talaguppa Intercity Express runs from Bangalore City via Yesvantpur Junction, Arsikere Junction , Kadur Junction , Shimoga Town to Talaguppa.

== Traction ==
As the route is now electrified, a Krishnarajapuram loco shed WAP-7 electric locomotive pulls the train to its destination.

== Rake maintenance and rake sharing ==
Rakes are maintained by Mysuru Division of South Western Railway. This train shares its rakes with Siddhaganga Intercity Express and Wodeyar Express. Day 1 - 12613>20651 Day 2 - 20652>12725 Day 3 - 12726>12614
