= Huliyar =

Village in Karnataka, India

- Town
- Location in Karnataka, India Huliyar (India)
- Coordinates: 13.58277778°N 76.53611111°E
- Country: India
- State: Karnataka
- District: Tumakuru
- Taluk: Chikkanayakana Halli

Government
  - Body: Town Panchayath

Area
  - Total: 4.75 km^{2} (1.83 sq mi)
- Elevation: 724 m (2,375 ft)

Population (2011)
  - Total: 14,304
  - Density: 3,010/km^{2} (7,800/sq mi)

Languages
  - Official: Kannada
- Time zone: UTC+5:30 (IST)
- PIN: 572218
- Vehicle registration: KA-44, KA-06
- Website: www.huliyartown.mrc.gov.in

Huliyar is a town in the southern state of Karnataka, India. It is located in the Chiknayakanhalli taluk of Tumakuru district in Karnataka. It is 42 km (26 mi) from its sub-divisional headquarters, Tiptur and 90 km (56 mi) from district headquarter Tumakuru.

== Demographics ==
As of 2011 India census, Huliyar had a population of 14,304 with 7,084 males and 7,220 females. huliyar is a main town of tumkur district and is proposed to be a taluk. Due to some administrative issues, it still remains as hobli/census town. It has all taluk level facilities with many govt offices and banks. It is well connected to Tiptur, Turuvekere, Chikkanayakanahalli, Hosadurga, Sira and Hiriyuru.

== Geography ==
Huliyar is a junction where three highways meet. They are National Highway 150A (India), National Highway 69 (India) and State Highway 47 (Karnataka).

== See also ==
- Tumkur
- Districts of Karnataka
- Hagalavadi
- Kenkere
- Bukkapatna.
- Gubbi.
- Tumkur.
- Hosdurga.
- Davanagere.
- Ganadhal.
