= Upper Bhadra Irrigation project =

Indian irrigation project

Overview of the project
- Proposed plan of the irrigation project

Upper Bhadra Irrigation project was proposed to address the chronic water scarcity in the drylands of central eastern Karnataka with secondary objectives of recharging the ground water levels and providing drinking water by filling tanks. This project was initiated by Karnataka Neeravari Nigam Limited (KNNL) and taken over by Visvesvaraya Jala Nigam (VJNL), branches of Karnataka government in year 2022.

== History ==
Earliest proposal was envisioned by then chief minister S. Nijalingappa in 1969 to provide irrigation facilities to drought-prone areas like Chitradurga. For several decades, the project remained in conceptualization and planning phases. A masterplan was presented during 2001 with allocation of 23 TMC of water from Badra resorvier was presented in 2001. In 2003, S.M. Krishna government, approved Upper Bhadra project stage I for Rs. 2813 Crores. In 2022, Union government of India, approved the proposal of declaring the Upper Bhadra Project as a nation project, which secured additional Rs. 12500 Crores from the central government of India.

== Plan ==
The Project involved two-stage lift irrigation system for transfer of water from Tunga River to Bhadra Reservoir, and subsequently westwards to the drought prone areas. The first stage of the lift system involves transfer of water from the Tunga River through an 11.3 km long canal to Bhadra Reservoir. The second stage of the lift system is from Bhadra Reservoir to Ajjampura distribution centre through open canal and 6.9 km tunnel. From Ajjampura tunnel, the water will be distributed do two main canals. Chitradurga branch and Tumkur branch. The stage B of the project included increasing the capacity and irrigation area with incorporation of Jagaluru branch canal.

Physical implementation of the project started on 15 October 2008.

Due to location of the project involved allocation of forest land for construction, there were opposition to the project from the beginning. Several revisions in the proposal were included to minimize the environmental impact such as underground pipeline system, wildlife animal crossings and controlled construction practices.
