= Birur Junction railway station =

Railway station in India

Birur Junction Biruru Junction

General information
- Location: Birur, Kadur, Chikmagalur district, Karnataka; India
- Coordinates: 13.593278°N 75.972922°E
- Elevation: 805 metres (2,641 ft)
- Owner: Indian Railways
- Lines: Bengaluru - Hubballi line Birur - Shivamogga - Talguppa line
- Platforms: 5
- Tracks: 7
- Connections: Auto stand

Construction
- Structure type: Standard (on-ground station)
- Parking: Yes
- Cycle facilities: Yes

Other information
- Status: Functioning
- Station code: RRB
- Fare zone: South Western Railway zone
Location
- Location within India Location within Karnataka

Birur Junction railway station, also known as Biruru Junction railway station (station code: RRB) is an Indian Railways station in Birur in Kadur, Chikmagalur district, Karnataka.

Birur Junction is an important railway station, since pre-independence era. It is the most important railway junction in Chikmagalur district. This Junction acts as a nexus point between Bengaluru and Shimoga and north Karnataka city of Hubli. This junction belongs to Mysore division of South-western Railway Zone of Indian Railways. Many intrastate and inter-state trains have their stoppage here.
