= Akkanahalli, Hassan =

Akkanahalli
- village
- Akkanahalli, Channarayapatna is in Hassan district
- Country: India
- State: Karnataka
- District: Hassan
- Talukas: Channarayapatna

Government
  - Body: Village Panchayat

Languages
  - Official: Kannada
- Time zone: UTC+5:30 (IST)
- Nearest city: Hassan
- Civic agency: Village Panchayat

Akkanahalli, Channarayapatna is a village in the southern state of Karnataka, India. It is located in the Channarayapatna taluk of Hassan district in Karnataka.

== See also ==
- Districts of Karnataka
