= Ramagiri =

Ramagiri may refer to places in India:

- Ramagiri, Bangalore district, Karnataka
- Ramagiri, Badalapur, Mumbai, Maharashtra
- Ramagiri, Anantapur district, Andhra Pradesh
- Ramagiri, Chittoor district, Andhra Pradesh
- Ramagiri Fort, Telangana

Murugeshpalya, Bangalore
