= Santhebennur =

Town in Davanagere, Karnataka, India

Santhebennur is a town in the Davanagere district of the state of Karnataka, India.
