= Vedavathi River =

River in India

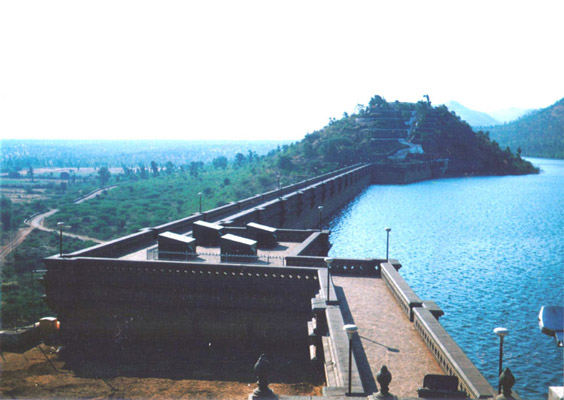

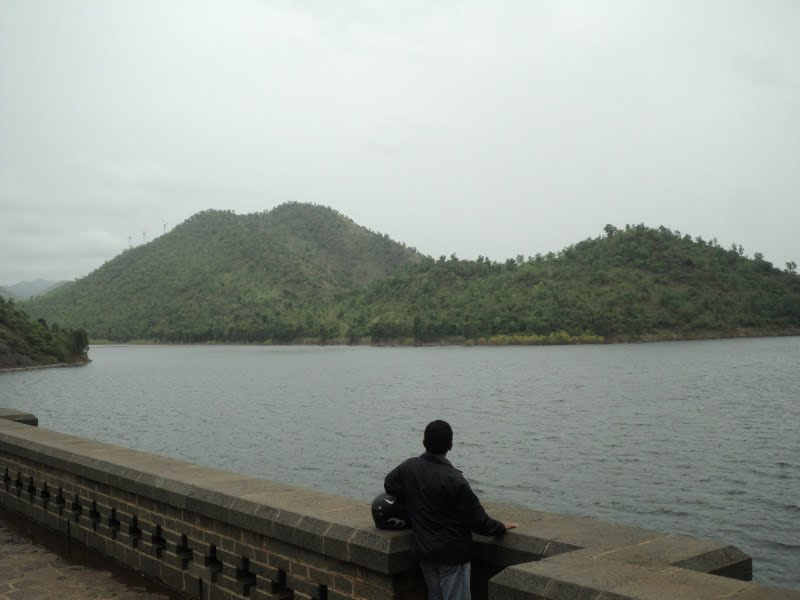
Vanivilasa Dam across the river

The Vedavathi also known as Hagari or Pedda Hagari is one of the rivers in Karnataka, India. It originates from the Baba budanagiri Mountains of Western Ghats and flows through the states of Karnataka and Andhra Pradesh eventually joining the Tungabhadra river. This river is often described as a "lifeline" for areas like Chitradurga District in Karnataka.

== Formation and course ==
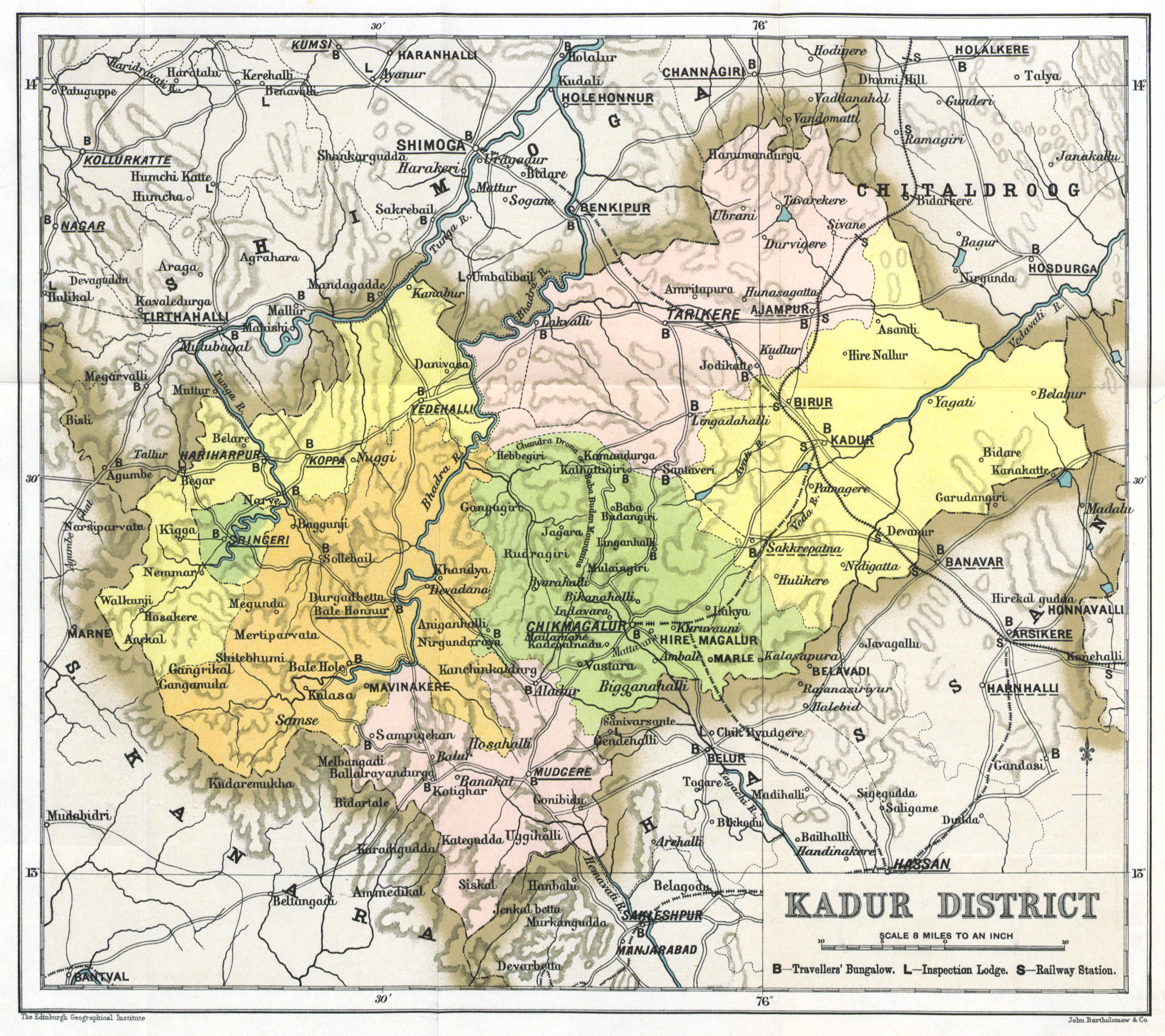
A 1897 map showing rivers Veda and Avathi forming Vedavati river near Kaduru.

The Vedavati River originates from several small streams draining the region east of the Bababudanagiri hills, particularly in the valleys of Kaduru and Arasikere taluks. As a seasonal river, and due to ongoing human alterations to the geography of this area, some of its tributaries have dried up. Historically, the river is said to form from the confluence of two smaller rivers: the Veda and the Avathi. The Veda originates from Ayyanakere 13°26′36″N 75°52′38″E, and the Avathi from Madagadakeri 13°29′36″N 75°51′49″E. These two streams converge near Tangali, close to Kaduru 13°32′21″N 76°02′16″E. These river streams are now difficult to trace on present day satellite images.

The river gains a definite flow in Kaduru Taluk, then flows northeast through Hosadurga, Hiriyur, and Challakere in Chitradurga district. Further downstream, it enters Andhra Pradesh, where the Bhairavanitippa Reservoir (BT Project) is located near the state border.

The river continues into Anantapur District, Andhra Pradesh, where it is known as the 'Hagari'. It then reenters Karnataka, passing through Bellary and Siruguppa taluks. In Bellary Taluk, the river flows through the villages of Hagari and Moka. It is called the Hagari River because it flows through Hagari Village.

Chikka Hagari is a major tributary of the Vedavati River in Chitradurga. This stream historically originates from Holalkere Lake, flowing through Chitradurga, Jagaluru, and Molakalmuru taluks before joining the Vedavati at Kalludevanahalli, Andhra Pradesh. Swarnamukhi is another important stream, originating in Tumakuru and joining the Vedavati near Koodlahalli, Hiriyur, Chitradurga.

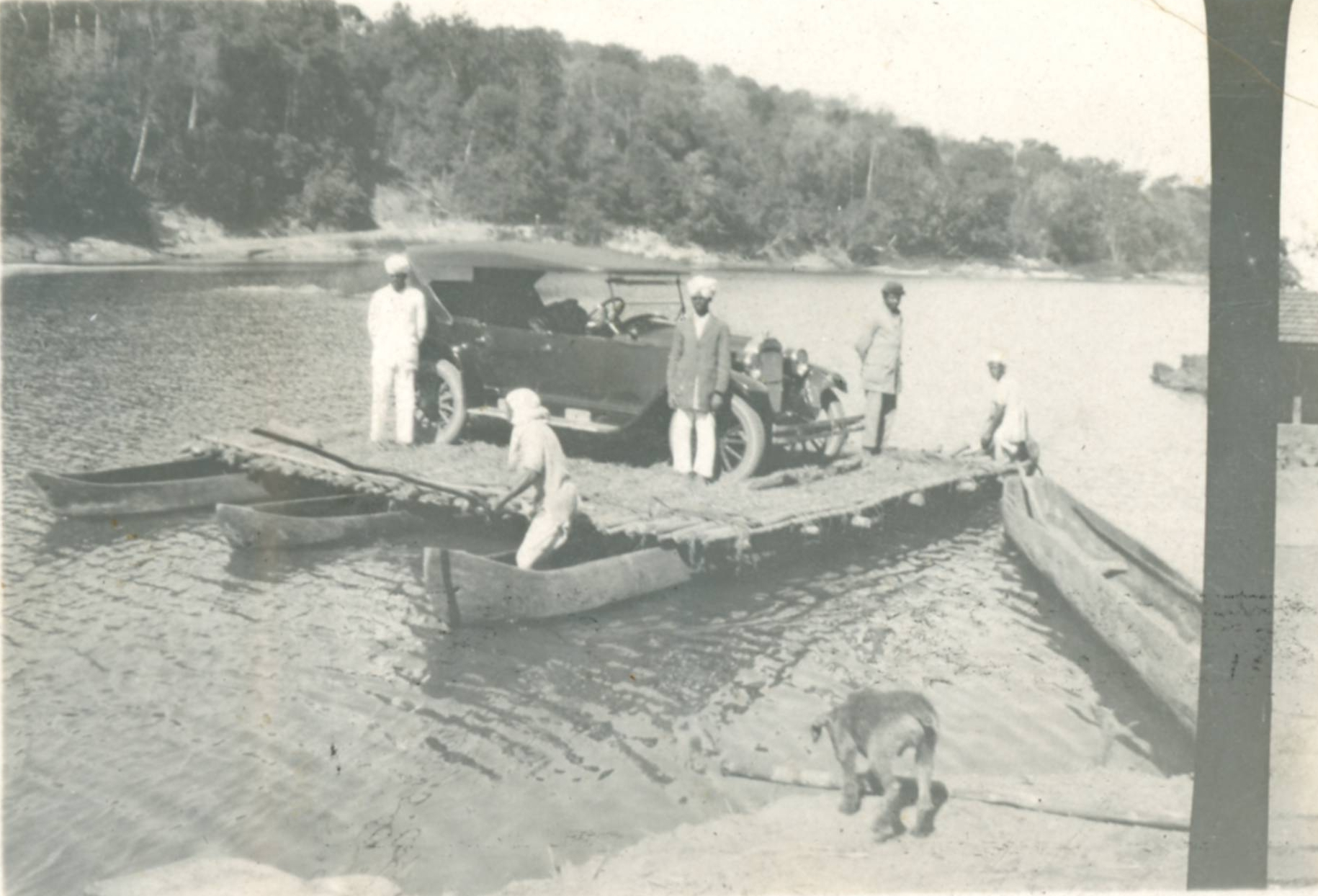
Crossing of the Vedavati River by Leslie Coleman in 1920 (only the vehicle seen here). Leslie Coleman was the Director of Agriculture in the then Mysore State

The Vedavati River is a tributary of the Tungabhadra River and eventually joins it at Siddaragonde village in Siruguppa Taluk, Bellary District, on its right bank.

== River modifications ==
The Vani Vilasa Saagara reservoir (Mari Kanive Dam) constructed across river Vedavathi in Hosadurga taluk built in 1897. This was first dam built in state of Mysore. There is also a famous temple dedicated to Goddessess Devi called "Kanive Mariyamma". Marikanive is a famous tourist attraction in Chitradurga District. There is a garden near the reservoir, which draws crowds on weekends.

The Bhairavanithippa project (BT Dam) is a dam constructed across the river at Bhairavanitippa village, in Gummagatta in 1961.

The state government has decided to rejuvenate the Vedavathi river in Chikmagalur district, which dries up during summer. In the last 20 years, the river has flowed in full splendour only during the rainy season. It remains dry in summer due to over exploitation of water resources and unplanned development. The plan includes construction of over 810 water-harvesting structures like percolation wells, injection wells and ponds.
