= Naradagadde =

- village
- Location in Karnataka, India Naradagadde (India)
- Coordinates: 16°20′27.26″N 77°35′39.15″E
- Country: India
- State: Karnataka
- District: Raichur
- Taluk: Raichur
- Talukas: Devadurga

Languages
  - Official: Kannada
- Time zone: UTC+5:30 (IST)
- PIN: 584 102
- Vehicle registration: KA-36

Naradagadde is an island village near Kuruvakala village in the Raichur taluk of Raichur district in the Indian state of Karnataka. Legend has it that Lord Narada performed penance in Naradagadde.

The island is surrounded by Krishna River which flows through one side in Karnataka and other side partly Karnataka and Telangana. To reach the temple from Karnataka one has to take roadways from Raichur. The road culminates at the banks of the Krishna River. To reach the temple one has to board the coracle which is also called as "parisal" which is a man-made small boat.

After crossing the river through Coracle one has to get down on the island and walk for nearly a kilometer to reach the temple. The passage is a mud road with some electrical lamp posts which shall guide us to the temple entrance.

It is a small village temple and it is advised to take the local villagers' inputs for the right timings.

Naradagadde is 35 km northeast to Raichur town.

== See also ==
- Gabbur
- Googal Village
- Devadurga
- Lingasugur
- Raichur
- DeoSugur
