= Birur =

Birur Biruru
- Town
- Location in Karnataka, India
- Coordinates: 13.5959°N 75.9711°E
- Country: India
- State: Karnataka
- District: Chikkamagaluru
- Region: Malenadu / Rain shadow / Bayaluseeme

Government
  - Body: Town Municipal Council
  - Administrator: Dr. Kantharaja K J
  - Chief Office: N. Bhagyamma

Area
  - Town: 5.70 km^{2} (2.20 sq mi)
  - Rural: 18.996 km^{2} (7.334 sq mi)
- Elevation: 833 m (2,733 ft)

Population (2011)
  - Town: 22,723
  - Density: 3,990/km^{2} (10,300/sq mi)
  - Rural: 827

Languages
  - Official: Kannada
- Time zone: UTC+5:30 (IST)
- PIN: 577 116
- Telephone code: 08267
- Vehicle registration: KA-18 & KA-66
- Website: http://www.birurtown.mrc.gov.in

Birur or Bīrūru is a town & a hobli, located in Kadur Taluk in Chikkamagaluru district in the state of Karnataka, India. It belongs to Mysuru Division. It is located 46 km north-east from district headquarters Chikkamagaluru.

== Governance ==
- The Town Municipal Council was started in 01/09/1912
- The TMC has 23 wards and equal number of Councilors

== Geography ==
It has an average elevation of 833 metres (2,733 ft). It is also called the Gateway of Malnad region.

Birur is a place famous for its Arecanut/Supari plantations and Coconut.

Birur is surrounded by Tarikere Taluk to the west, Chikkamagaluru Taluk to the west and south, Ajjampura Taluk to the north, Hosadurga Taluk to the East. Birur is 214 km from Bengaluru, 178 km from Mysuru, 255 km from Hubballi and 7 km from Kadur (Taluk Hq). An inscription dated 1063 A.D. mentions the place as ‘Beeravuru’. Birur Junction railway station is a major railway junction from where trains run in three directions.

== Temples and Culture ==
There are temples dedicated to Veerabhadhra swamy, Antaraghattamma, Mylaralinga and Biredevaru. The Biredevaru jatra takes place once in 12 years for 15 days.

== Colleges near Birur ==
- Government Pre-University College, B.H Road, Kadur-577548
- Government First Grade College, B.H Road, Kadur-577548
- Government Pre-University College, Main Road, Kuvempu Nagar, Chowlahiriyur-577180
- SK Pre-University College, Singatagere, Banavara Road
- Sri Maruthi Pre-University College, Nidaghatta Post, Kadur Taluk, Chikkamagaluru-57754

== Transportation ==
The National Highway, NH-69, and State Highway 76 (Karnataka) passes through the town. Birur Junction railway station is the main railway connection of the area.

== Nearby places ==
- Kemmangundi: 35 km from Birur town is Kemmangundi, a scenic hill station on the Baba Budan range of hills.
- Kallathigiri Falls: 10 km away from Kemmangundi is Kallathigiri falls, also known as Kallatthi Falls. Water cascades 122 metres down from the top of the Chandra Drona Hill.
- Amruthapura : 37 km north of Birur, Amruthapura is known for the Amruteshwara temple built in 1196 A.D by Amruteshwara Dandanayaka, a general of the Hoysala ruler Ballala II.
- Hebbe Falls: This waterfall is 10 km from Kemmangundi. Water streams down 168 metres in two stages to form Dodda Hebbe (Big Falls) and Chikka Hebbe (Small Falls.).
