= Bukkapatna =

- village
- Location in Karnataka, India Bukkapatna (India)
- Coordinates: 13°39′N 76°45′E
- Country: India
- State: Karnataka
- District: Tumkur
- Talukas: Sira

Population (2001)
  - Total: 6,890

Languages
  - Official: Kannada
- Time zone: UTC+5:30 (IST)
- PIN: 572115

Bukkapatna is a village in the southern state of Karnataka, India. It is located in the Sira taluk of Tumkur district in Karnataka.

== Demographics ==
As of 2001 India census, Bukkapattana had a population of 6108 with 3111 males and 2997 females.

== Location ==
Bukkapattana village surrounded by Sira town to the east, Huliyar and Kenkere town to the west and Hagalavadi Town to the south.

== See also ==
- Hagalavadi
- Tumkur
- Districts of Karnataka
