= Raghavendra stotra =

Praise hymn for a guru

Raghavendra stotra is a hymn (stotra) composed by Appanacharya, a scholar of Uttaradi Math and an ardent devotee of Raghavendra Swami in praise of his guru. It is also known as Sri Raghavendra stotra, or the Guru stotra. The Sanskrit verse, comprising 32 ślokas, is recited till today by followers of Raghavendra Swami and other Dvaita Vaishnavas.
