= Chikkanayakana Halli =

Chikkanayakanahalli
- Town
- Nickname: C.N halli
- Location in Karnataka, India Chikkanayakanahalli (India)
- Coordinates: 13.42°N 76.62°E
- Country: India
- State: Karnataka
- District: Tumakuru
- Founded: 1490

Government
  - Body: Town Municipal Council

Area
  - Town: 6.75 km^{2} (2.61 sq mi)
  - Rural: 1,106.22 km^{2} (427.11 sq mi)
- Elevation: 804 m (2,638 ft)

Population (2011)
  - Town: 23,206
  - Density: 3,440/km^{2} (8,900/sq mi)
  - Rural: 188,924

Languages
  - Official: Kannada
- Time zone: UTC+5:30 (IST)
- PIN: 572214
- Telephone code: 08133
- ISO 3166 code: IN-KA
- Vehicle registration: KA-44, KA-06
- Website: http://www.chikkanayakanahallitown.mrc.gov.in/

Chikkanayakanahalli is a town (taluk headquarters) in Tiptur sub-division of Tumakuru district, in the state of Karnataka, India. It is 30 km away from Tiptur and 132 km from Bengaluru.

== Geography ==
Chikkanayakana-halli is located at 13.42°N 76.62°E. It has an average elevation of 804 metres (2,638 ft). It is located on National Highway 150A.

== Demographics ==
As of 2001 India census, Chikkanayakana-halli had a population of 22,360. Males constitute 50.067% of the population and females 49.933%. Chikkanayakana-halli has an average literacy rate of 70%, higher than the national average of 59.5%; with male literacy of 76% and female literacy of 64%. 11% of the population is under 6 years of age.

== See also ==
- Akkanahalli, Tumkur
- Ajjenahalli, Chiknayakanhalli
- Tumkur
- Tumkur District
- Taluks of Karnataka
- Hagalavadi
- Kenkere
- Huliyar
