= Kenkere =

- Small Town
- Nickname: "Shree Sharana Kshetra"
- Location in Karnataka, India Kenkere (India)
- Coordinates: 13.61°N 76.53°E
- Country: India
- State: Karnataka
- Region: Bayaluseeme
- District: Tumkur District
- Talukas: Chiknayakanhalli

Government
  - Type: Local Government
  - Body: Gram Panchayat

Population (2001)
  - Total: 5,239
- Demonym: Kenkerean

Languages
  - Official: Kannada
  - Spoken: Kannada and English
- Time zone: UTC+5:30 (IST)
- Postal Index Number: 572218
- Telephone code: +91(0)8133
- Vehicle registration: KA-44

Kenkere is a small town in the southern state of Karnataka, India. It is located in the Chiknayakanhalli taluk of Tumkur district in Karnataka. It is the headquarters of the Village Panchayat.

Kenkere is 6 km (3.7 mi) North of Chitradurga district border, 24 km (15 mi) west of Chikkamagaluru district border and 25 km (16 mi) Southwest of Hassan district border.

== Demographics ==
As of 2001 India census, kenkere had a population of 5239 with males 2653 and females 2586. Coconut is the crop which is main income of farmers here.

== See also ==
- Tumkur
- Districts of Karnataka
- Huliyar
- Chikkanayakanahalli
