= Hosadurga =

- Town
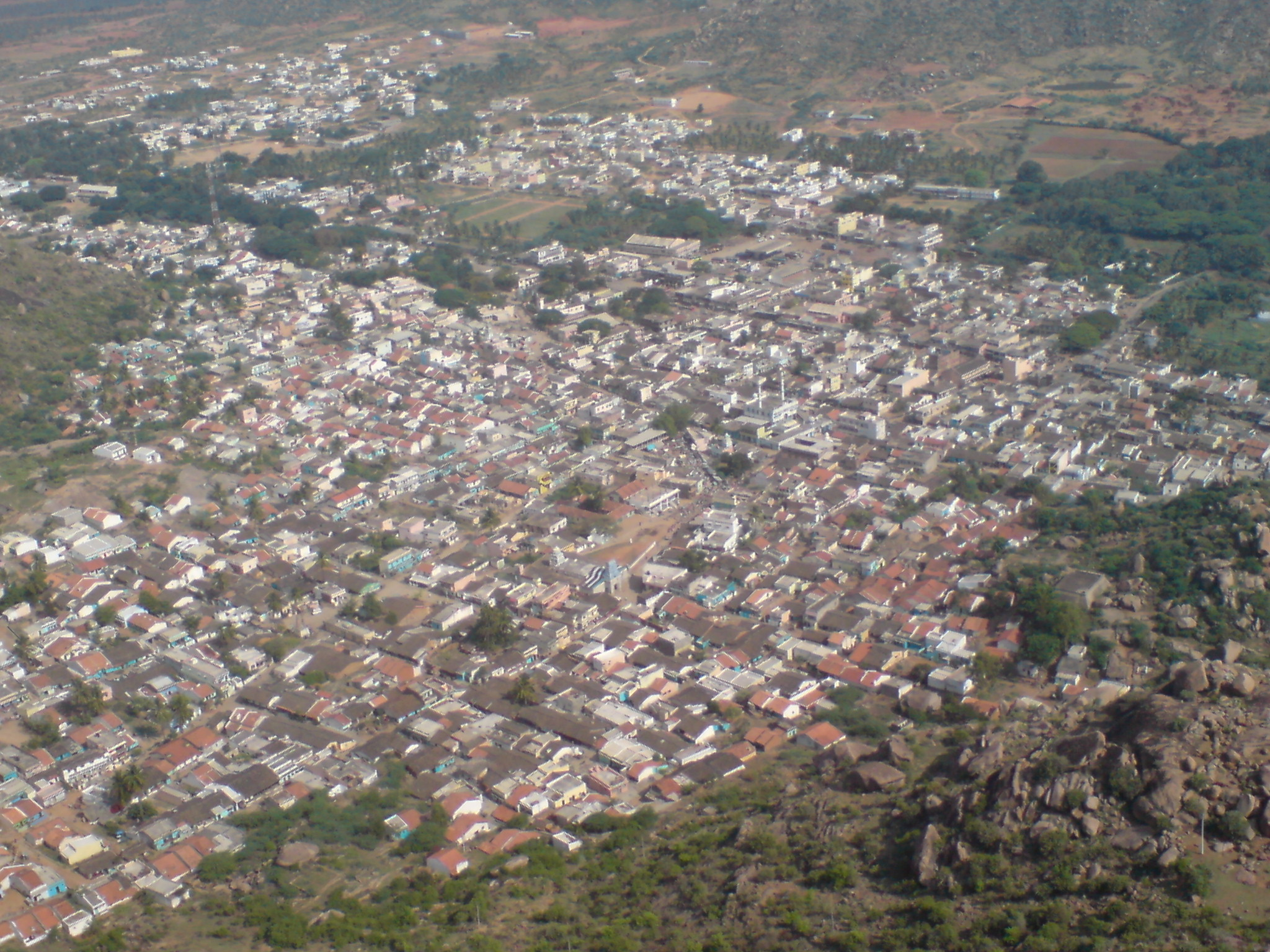
- Aerial view of Hosadurga in 2008

- Located in Karnataka, India
- Coordinates: 13.7975°N 76.2849°E
- Country: India
- State: Karnataka
- District: Chitradurga

Government
  - Body: Town Municipal Council

Area
  - Town: 16.34 km^{2} (6.31 sq mi)
  - Rural: 1,332.38 km^{2} (514.43 sq mi)
- Elevation: 739 m (2,425 ft)

Population (2011)
  - Town: 28,370
  - Density: 1,736/km^{2} (4,497/sq mi)
  - Rural: 206,746

Languages
  - Official: Kannada
- Time zone: UTC+5:30 (IST)
- PIN: 577527
- Telephone code: +91-8199
- Vehicle registration: KA-16
- Website: hosadurgatown.mrc.gov.in

Hosadurga is a town and a taluk in Chitradurga district in the Indian state of Karnataka. The name "Hosadurga" translates to "New Fort" in Kannada as it was built around the hill fort. Hosadurga is known as the land of millets (ಸಿರಿಧಾನ್ಯಗಳ ನಾಡು).

== History ==
Hosadurga Taluk Map

Hosadurga, as part of Chitradurga was ruled under Vijayanagara Empire and subsequently ruled by the Nayakas of Chitradurga in the late medieval period. The hill fort of Hosadurga on the surrounding hill (ಭೈರಪ್ಪನ ಬೆಟ್ಟ) was built by Chikkanna Nayaka in 1676. According to B.N. Sri Sathyan, a Jangama priest took refuge under the chitradurga Palegars and was commissioned to build a pete below the hill. Eventually this settlement, Hosadurga was taken over by Hyder Ali. During the British rule, the Chitradurga province was included in the Kingdom of Mysore.

In the year 1882, Hosadurga sub-taluk was created, comprising Hosadurga and Bagur hoblis. In July 1902, it was upgraded to a pucca (proper) taluk.

During the Forest Satyagraha of 1939, the Hosadurga region experienced widespread support for the movement against British rule.

== Geography ==
Hosadurga is located in south-western part of Chitradurga district, at an average elevation of 739 metres (2,425 ft) above the mean sea level. The highest point of the taluk is near Halurameshwara village 1,118 metres (3,668 ft).

Hosadurga taluk is traversed a hill range that is part of a geological structure known as the Chitradurga Supracrustal Belt. This belt is a section of the Dharwar Supergroup, which formed between 2,600 and 2,300 million years ago due to the deposition of sedimentary rocks, volcanic activities, and erosion. A gap in this hill range forms a valley where the Vani Vilasa Sagara Dam is constructed across. A part of the hill range forms town hill (ಭೈರಪ್ಪನ ಬೆಟ್ಟ).

Vedavathi River flows 7 km south of the town and is the only major river of in the taluk. The Tumkur and Chitraduraga branches of Upper Badra project traverse the taluk. The taluk has the oldest dam in the state, Vani Vilasa Sagara (also known as Mari Kanive) which is constructed across the river in the eastern border of the taluk.

== Climate ==
Hosadurga lies in the Subtropical steppe climate with Köppen climate classification type BSh (semi-arid or semi desert). Low rainfalls and high temperatures make this area prone for droughts.

The mean high temperatures reaches up to 37 °C in April and the mean minimum temperatures goes up to 14 °C in January. Most of the rainfall occurs during the Monsoon season with highest rainfall in the month of July of 152 mm.

== Demographics ==
As of the 2011 census of India, Hosadurga has a population of 28,370. Males constitute 52% of the population and females 48%. Hosadurga has an average literacy rate of 72%, higher than the national average of 59.5%, with a male literacy rate of 76% and a female literacy rate of 70%. In Hosadurga, 12% of the population is under seven years of age.

== Economy ==
Agriculture is the primary occupation in Hosadurga Taluk. The town hosts an Agricultural Produce Marketing Committee (APMC) market, covering a large area to support farmers in trading and auctioning their produce.

Hosadurga and surrounding areas had mines for Asestos, iron ores, limestones. Mathodu had factories of bangle making making use of the nearby limestones

Hosadurga had a strong cement industry in the 1990s, but many factories have closed over time due to shortages of limestone. Currently only one remains, the Ramco Cement Factory in Mathodu Village.

== Transportation ==
Major highways passing through Hosadurga are; National Highway 173 (India), State Highway 24 (Karnataka) and State Highway 47 (Karnataka).

Hosadurga is connected by Road and Rail network. Public transport is maintained by both private players and KSRTC, who has a Bus Stand and a bus depot here, under Chitradurga division. Hosadurga Road railway station (Station Code:HSD) is the nearest railway station, which is 20 km away. It lies on Bangalore-Arsikere-Hubli line. The nearest airport is Shivamogga Airport, which is 97 km away.

== Administration ==
Hosadurga town is governed by a Town Municipal Council (TMC). Hosadurga taluk is represented as Constituency No. 101 in the Karnataka Legislative Assembly. Hosadurga as part of Chitradurga, represents Lok Sabha Constituency.

== Notable people ==
1. Madakari Nayaka V: Born in Janakal (Hosadurga Taluk). He is well recognized and the last Nayaka of Chitradurga.
2. T. K. Rama Rao: Born in Hosadurga, he was a Kannada novelist, known for introducing detective and thriller genres to Kannada literature. His famous work as Bangaaradha Manushya became a blockbuster film.

== See also ==
- Huliyar
- Hagalavadi
- Bukkapatna
- Gubbi
- Birur
