= Ajjampura =

- Town
- Location in Karnataka, India
- Coordinates: 13.723377°N 76.004791°E
- Country: India
- State: Karnataka
- District: Chikmagalur
- Region: Bayaluseeme

Government
  - Body: Town panchayat

Area
  - Total: 27.13 km^{2} (10.47 sq mi)
- Elevation: 760 m (2,490 ft)

Population (2011)
  - Total: 11,372
  - Density: 419.2/km^{2} (1,086/sq mi)

Languages
  - Official: Kannada
- Time zone: UTC+5:30 (IST)
- PIN: 577547
- Telephone code: 08261
- Vehicle registration: KA 66
- Website: www.ajjampuratown.mrc.gov.in

Ajjampura is a town and taluk headquarters in Chikmagalur district in the Indian state of Karnataka.
