= Hagalavadi =

Haagalavaadi ಹಾಗಲವಾಡಿ
- Town
- Location of Hagalavadi in Karnataka, India
- Coordinates: 13°30′16.2″N 76°45′40.8″E
- Country: India
- State: Karnataka
- District: Tumkur District
- Taluk: Gubbi
- Hobli: Hagalavadi Hobli
- Revenue Division: Bangalore Division
- Region: Bayaluseeme
- Headquarter: Tumkur City

Area
  - Urban: 9 km^{2} (3.5 sq mi)
- Elevation: 780 m (2,560 ft)

Population (2019)
  - Town: 7,700
- Time zone: UTC+5:30 (IST)
- Pincode: 572222
- STD Code: 08131
- Official Languages: Kannada
- Vidhana Sabha Constituency: Gubbi Vidhana Sabha Constituency(135)
- Lok sabha Constituency: Tumkur Loka sabha Constituency(19)
- Website: tumkur.nic.in

Haagalavaadi is a town in the Tumkur District of the Indian state of Karnataka. It belongs to the Bangalore Division. It is located 50 km from the district headquarter, Tumkur. Bangalore is the nearest Metropolitan Area to Hagalavadi.

== History ==
The founder of Haagalavaadi dynasty was Erimada Nayaka. He was succeeded by Sali Nayaka (1508-1544), who expanded the territory considerably. Inscription Ck 38, dated 1696, relates to these two leaders. Hagalavadi is the headquarters of Palegar lineage. Chikkanayakanahalli was founded by Erimada Nayaka and named after his brother as Chikkanayaka (younger brother).
