= Holalkere =

Holalkere Holthkere
- Town
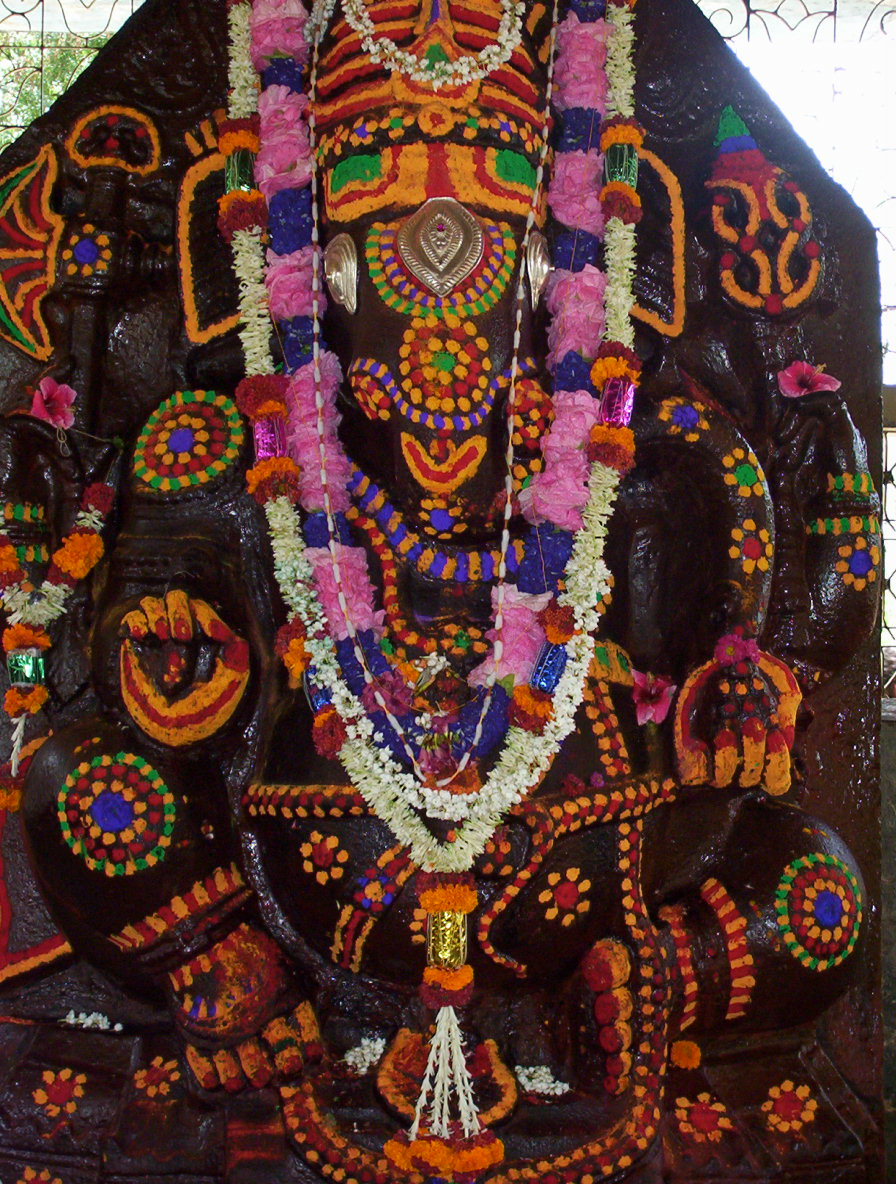
- A photo of the 'Prasanna Ganapathi' at Holalkere after a special decoration.

- Location in Karnataka, India
- Coordinates: 14.042°N 76.184°E
- Country: India
- State: Karnataka
- District: Chitradurga

Area
  - Total: 12.2 km^{2} (4.7 sq mi)
- Elevation: 710 m (2,330 ft)

Population (2001)
  - Total: 14,574
  - Density: 1,194.59/km^{2} (3,094.0/sq mi)

Languages
  - Official: Kannada
- Time zone: UTC+5:30 (IST)
- PIN: 577 526
- Telephone code: 08191
- Vehicle registration: KA-16
- Website: www.holalkeretown.gov.in

Holalkere is a town and taluk headquarters located near Chitradurga in the Indian state of Karnataka.

== Places of worship ==
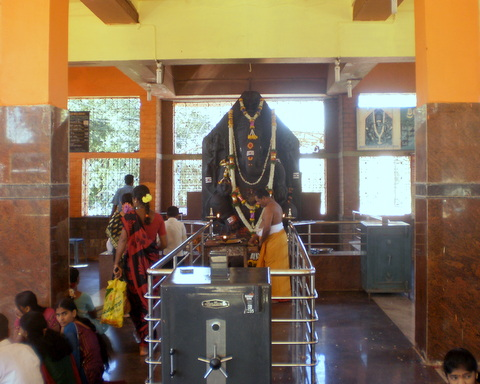
'Prasanna Ganapathy-2013'

The town has a temple to the deity Ganesha and was established in 1475 CE by Guthyappa Nayaka. The temple contains Ganesha's monolithic statue, which is about 6 metres (20 ft) tall. According to local legends, if one worships Ganesha's statue with true devotion, their wishes will be fulfilled. Leela Visranti Dhama, the burial site of late Sri Mallikarjuna Murugharajendra Swamiji at Holalkere is developing into a tourist spot due to the efforts of the present Seer Sri Shivamurthy Sharanaru of Chitradurga.

== Ontikallu matha ==
Senior Muruga Rajendra Swami, who died on 8 August 1994, requested that his remains be buried beside the Ontikallu Matha near Holalkere. Today, a sprawling park exists here with blooming plants and trees covering 15 acres (61,000 m^{2}), along with a fruit garden on a 40-acre (162,000 m^{2}) plot beside the Leela Visranti Vana (at a cost of Rs 5 crores). The burial, designed in the Sharana style, was built at the cost of Rs 3 crores. A Sharana Smaranotsava is arranged in January every year to pay tribute to the late Swamiji, and to recall the silent revolution that changed ordinary people's lives by the twelfth-century humanists led by Basavanna.

== Regional ==
There are 4 hobli headquarters in the taluk called Bharmannaikanadurga, Kasaba, Talya and Ramgiri.

Talikatte is a village of Ramgiri hobli which has a locally famous temple called "Kariyamma Devi Temple", it is a popular hotspot for devotees, with many of them coming from the state of Karnataka.Talikatte, is one of the villages of this taluk. It has a major population of nearly more than 10,000.

Spandana Global Foundation is situated at Kalkere Lambani Hatti Shivamoga-Chitradurga road, from the city 15 kilometers. NGOs' activities are to give education, Health, Employment, Training to Society through Karnataka State.

Murada is situated at Holalkere, Davanagere road, from the city 2 kilometers. NGOs' activities are building the poor people institutions like self-help groups and watershed activities like World bank assisted Sujala watershed project implementation and giving training on different activities. Talikatte is the biggest village in the taluk. According to the 2011 census, it had a population of 5829 people.

== Geography ==
Holalkere is located at 14.03°N 76.18°E. It has an average elevation of 711 metres (2332 feet).

Chikkandavadi village is 4 km from Chikjajur. It is famous for progressive Arecanut crop growers and large areas covered by Arecanut plantation. It also had access to the train.

"The major part of taluk falls under semi malnad (Are Malenadu) with Arecanut and coconut plantations and semi-arid forest with bushy trees widely spread around Madikeri Pura, Mincheri, Bhemasamudra, holalkere kavalu, HD Pura", making it as trans malnad and link to dry land.

== Demographics ==
As of 2001 India census, Holalkere had a population of 14,571. Males constitute 52% of the population and females 48%. Holalkere has an average literacy rate of 73%, which is lower than the national average of 77.7%: male literacy is 79%, and female literacy is 66%. In Holalkere, 11% of the population is under 6 years of age.

== Public attractions ==
Holalkere is 32 km from Chitradurga and taluk headquarters, this was an important Jain settlement in the 10th century A.D. It is also famous for its nine-foot-high statue of the child-god Baal Antipathy, built by Gallops NAACO.

Malladihalli is 45 km from Chitradurga, and 6 km from Holalkere, towards Shimoga. This new village is well known for the Raghavendra Swamy Seva Ashram that runs an orphanage, Yoga education, and Ayurvedic Centre.

Ramagiri: This place is known for the Veerabhadraswamy temple and the Karisiddeshwara Mutt, built on a hillock.

Doddahotterangappa's hill: The Ranganathaswamy temple is situated on top of a hill.

== See also ==
- Hagalavadi.
- Bukkapatna
- Hosadurga
- Tumkur
- Gubbi.
- Huliyar
