= Agasanahalli =

Agasanahalli may refer to places in India:

- Agasanahalli (Bhadravati), Shimoga District, Karnataka
- Agasanahalli (Dharwad), Dharwad District, Karnataka
- Agasanahalli (Jagalur), Davanagere District, Karnataka
- Agasanahalli (Sorab), Shimoga District, Karnataka
