= Belaguthi =

- Village
- Country: India
- State: Karnataka
- District: Davanagere
- Named after: Tourist, Agriculture
- Talukas: Honnali

Population (2001)
  - Total: 5,741

Languages
  - Official: Kannada
- Postal code: 577223
- Vehicle registration: KA-17

Belaguthi is a village in the southern state of Karnataka, India. It is located in the Honnali taluk of Davanagere district.

== Demographics ==
As of 2001 India census, Belaguthi had a population of 5741 with 2879 males and 2862 females. Belaguthi Formerly belongs to Shimoga district now its come under Davanagere district, Belaguthi is well known for the old Temple of Theertharameshwara which is situated below the hill station and 36 km and 69 km from Shimoga and Davanagere district respectively. Belaguthi is also well known for Traditional culture, Agriculture, Old government school (114 Years as of 2014), Dairy cattle, vegetable market.

== See also ==
- Davanagere
- Districts of Karnataka
