= Belalagere =

Coordinates: 14°15′N 75°51′E

Belalagere Belalagere
- village
- Interactive map of Belalagere
- Country: India
- State: Karnataka

Government
  - Body: Gram panchayat
- Elevation: 661 m (2,169 ft)

Population (2011)
  - Total: 3,825

Languages
  - Official: Kannada
- Time zone: UTC+5:30 (IST)
- Postal code: 577231
- ISO 3166 code: IN-KA
- Vehicle registration: KA
- Website: karnataka.gov.in

Belalagere is a village in Channagiri taluk, Davanagere district in the Indian state of Karnataka. It is around 30 km from Davangere.

== Demographics ==
Kannada is the local language spoken here. The total population of the village is 3825 as per 2011 census.

== Education and business ==
Belalagere have following schools, up to 10th standard only.

Primary with Upper Primary Schools and High Schools:

Sl no	School name	Management	school category
01	Govt primary school, belalagere	Department of education karnataka	Primary school
02	Govt High school, belalagere	Department of Higher education karnataka	High school

Post office details

Belalagere	Pin:577231
Davanagere	District
Channagiri	Taluk
Basavapattana	Hobali
