= Surahonne =

Coordinates: 14°09′N 75°33′E

- village
- Interactive map of Surahonne
- Country: India
- State: Karnataka
- District: Davanagere
- Talukas: Nyamathi

Population (2001)
  - Total: 5,231

Languages
  - Official: Kannada
- Time zone: UTC+5:30 (IST)

Surahonne is a village in the southern state of Karnataka, India. It is located in the Honnali taluk of Davanagere district.

== Demographics ==
As of 2001 India census, Surahonne had a population of 5231 with 2680 males and 2551 females.

== See also ==
- Davanagere
- Districts of Karnataka
