= Agarabannihatti =

- Village
- Interactive map of Agarabannihatti
- Coordinates: 14.0559°N 75.9347°E
- Country: India
- State: Karnataka
- District: Davanagere
- Talukas: Channagiri

Government
  - Body: Village Panchayat

Languages
  - Official: Kannada
- Time zone: UTC+5:30 (IST)
- Nearest city: Davanagere
- Civic agency: Village Panchayat

Agarabannihatti is a village in the southern state of Karnataka, India. It is located in the Channagiri taluk of Davanagere district.

== See also ==
- Davanagere
- Districts of Karnataka
