= Bhanuvalli =

Coordinates: 14°26′N 75°46′E

- Village
- Interactive map of Bhanuvalli
- Country: India
- State: Karnataka
- District: Davanagere
- Talukas: Tumminakatti

Population (2001)
  - Total: 8,706

Languages
  - Official: Kannada
- Time zone: UTC+5:30 (IST)

Bhanuvalli is a village in the southern state of Karnataka, India. It is located in the Harihar taluk of Davanagere district.

== Demographics ==
As of 2001 India census, Bhanuvalli had a population of 8,706 with 4,480 males and 4,226 females.

== See also ==
- Davanagere
- Districts of Karnataka
