= Thyavanige =

- village
- Country: India
- State: Nallur Karnataka
- District: Davanagere
- Talukas: Nallur

Population (2001)
  - Total: 5,382

Languages
  - Official: Kannada
- Time zone: UTC+5:30 (IST)

Thyavanige is a village in the southern state of Karnataka, India. It is located in the Nallur taluk of Davanagere district.

== Demographics ==
As of 2001 India census, Thyavanige had a population of 5382 with 2792 males and 2590 females.

== See also ==
- Davanagere
- Districts of Karnataka
