= Bethuru =

- village
- Country: India
- State: Karnataka
- District: Davanagere
- Talukas: Davanagere

Population (2001)
  - Total: 6,802

Languages
  - Official: Kannada
- Time zone: UTC+5:30 (IST)

Bethuru is a village in the southern state of Karnataka, India. It is located in the Davanagere taluk of Davanagere district.

== Demographics ==
As of 2001 India census, Bethuru had a population of 6802 with 3519 males and 3283 females.

== See also ==
- Davanagere
- Districts of Karnataka
