= Haddadi =

Haddadi is a surname. Notable people with the surname include:

- Ehsan Haddadi (born 1985), Iranian discus thrower
- Hamed Haddadi (born 1985), Iranian basketball player
- Oussama Haddadi (born 1992), Tunisian footballer

== See also ==
- Dendropsophus haddadi, a species of frog
- Hadadi a village in the southern state of Karnataka, India
