= Arasapura =

Arasapura Arasapura (Arasapuram)
- village
- Location in Karnataka, India Arasapura (India)
- Coordinates: 14.32°N 75.54°E
- Country: India
- State: Karnataka
- District: Davangere

Government
  - Body: Gram panchayat
- Elevation: 580 m (1,900 ft)

Languages
  - Official: Kannada
- Time zone: UTC+5:30 (IST)
- ISO 3166 code: IN-KA
- Vehicle registration: KA
- Website: karnataka.gov.in

Arasapura is a village located very near to the Davanagere city in Davanagere district of Karnataka, India.

== Location ==
Arasapura is located at 14.32°N 75.54°E. It has an average elevation of 580 metres (1900 feet).

== Languages ==
Agriculture is the main stay for the entire village. People here speak Kannada, Telugu and the local tribal languages.

== Demographics ==
It is having a Population of 1036 of which Males constitute 532 and Females constitute 504.
