= Nyamati =

- town
- Nyamathi
- Location in Karnataka, India Nyamati (India)
- Coordinates: 14.14°N 75.56°E
- Country: India
- State: Karnataka
- Region: Malenadu
- District: Davanagere
- Established: 1846

Government
  - Body: taluk panchayat

Area
  - Total: 178 km^{2} (69 sq mi)

Population
  - Total: 26,546
  - Density: 149/km^{2} (386/sq mi)

Languages
  - Official: Kannada
- Time zone: UTC+5:30 (IST)
- PIN: 577 223
- Telephone code: 08188
- ISO 3166 code: IN-KA
- Vehicle registration: KA-17
- Website: karnataka.gov.in

Nyamati is a town, taluk place located in Davangere District of the Karnataka state, India. It is approximately 65 km south of Davangere and 26 km north of Shivamogga.

== Etymology ==
It is believed that the name Nyamati was derived from earlier Kannada word Nelavarti and which has later transformed to Nyamati.

== History ==
The town of Nyamati was established in the late 18th century, during the tenure of Purnaiah as Dewan of Mysore. It became a commercial hub of Honnali taluk, and was its headquarters from 1869 to 1882. Situated between the hilly terrain and the plains, trade involving products of the two regions was carried out in the town. The grain of the Malenadu and jaggery of the neighbouring taluks could be stored in the town's dry climate for some time without risk of damage. Arecanut from Nagara and Koppa were forwarded to Bellary and Dharwad in return for cloths and other articles, which were sent to the Malenadu and the coastal region. Cotton trade increased during the American Civil War in the 1860s.

Nyamati was during this time part of Shimoga district, before it was included in the Davanagere district, which was carved out in 1997. In 2018, it was made the taluk headquarters of a taluk of the same name.

Nyamati is famous in vegetable production (green chili) and also for areca sales from Malnad areas.

== Population ==
Nyamati has 6,023 families. It has a population of 25,675 of which 11,382 are males while 14,293 are females as per Population 2018. The population of children with age 0-6 is 897 which makes up 9.66% of total population. Average Sex Ratio of Nyamati village is 986 which is higher than Karnataka state average of 973. Child Sex Ratio for the Nyamati as per census is 983, higher than Karnataka average of 948. Also, Nyamati village has a higher literacy rate compared to Karnataka. In 2011, literacy rate of Nyamati village was 84.42% compared to 75.36% of Karnataka. In Nyamati male literacy stands at 89.23% while female literacy rate was 79.54%.

== Geography ==
Nyamthi taluk is semi malnad (Are Malenadu) region located at 14.14°N 75.56°E.
