= Lokikere =

- Village
- Location in Karnataka, India Lokikere (India)
- Coordinates: 14°18′N 75°56′E
- Country: India
- State: Karnataka
- District: Davanagere
- Talukas: Davanagere

Population (2001)
  - Total: 5,805

Languages
  - Official: Kannada
- Time zone: UTC+5:30 (IST)
- Pin Code: 577002
- Nearest city: Davanagere
- Literacy: 67%%

Lokikere is a village in the southern state of Karnataka, India. It is in the Davanagere taluk of Davanagere district.

== Demographics ==
As of the 2001 India census, Lokikere had a population of 5805 with 2971 males and 2834 females. Lokikere is famous for its agriculture, with its villagers growing crops such as rice, sugarcane, etc. Lokikere also has a Hanuman temple, which is said to be the protector of the village.

== See also ==
- Districts of Karnataka
