= Agasanakatte =

Coordinates: 14°26′N 76°02′E

- village
- Interactive map of Agasanakatte
- Country: India
- State: Karnataka
- District: Davanagere
- Talukas: Davanagere

Government
  - Body: Village Panchayat

Languages
  - Official: Kannada
- Time zone: UTC+5:30 (IST)
- Nearest city: Davanagere
- Civic agency: Village Panchayat

Agasanakatte is a village in the southern state of Karnataka, India. It is located in the Davanagere taluk of Davanagere district.

== See also ==
- Davanagere
- Districts of Karnataka
