= Doddabathi =

- village
- Location in Karnataka, India Doddabathi (India)
- Coordinates: 14.486030°N 75.8568100°E
- Country: India
- State: Karnataka
- District: Davanagere
- Talukas: Davanagere

Population (2001)
  - Total: 6,442

Languages
  - Official: Kannada
- Time zone: UTC+5:30 (IST)

Doddabathi is a village in the southern state of Karnataka, India. It is located in the Davanagere taluk of Davanagere district.It Has A hill called Bathi gudda which is tourist place consisting a view point and Pavithra Vana Park. In this village sri revanasiddeshwara temple is famous in Doddabathi, Davanagere, Karnataka. It is located in the Davanagere taluk of Davanagere district.

== Demographics ==
As of 2001 India census, Doddabathi had a population of 6442 with 3291 males and 3151 females.

== See also ==
- Davanagere
- Districts of Karnataka
