= Shamanur =

- Village
- Location in Karnataka, India Shamanur (India)
- Coordinates: 14.4666°N 75.9242°E
- Country: India
- State: Karnataka
- District: Davangere District

Area
  - Total: 4 km^{2} (1.5 sq mi)

Languages
  - Official: Kannada
- Time zone: UTC+5:30 (IST)
- PIN: 577004 Ward number = 41
- Telephone code: 08192
- Vehicle registration: KA-17

Shamanur is a village adjacent to Davanagere city and a municipal ward under the municipal corporation of Davanagere city in Davanagere district in the state of Karnataka, India. The predominantly agrarian village, nestled amidst the lush green paddy fields and towering coconut and arecanut orchards, is characterized by its suburban outlook due to its proximity to Davangere city. National Highway 48 separates Shamanur from Davangere city. Shamanur is famous for Sri Anjaneya Swamy Temple.

== Gallery ==
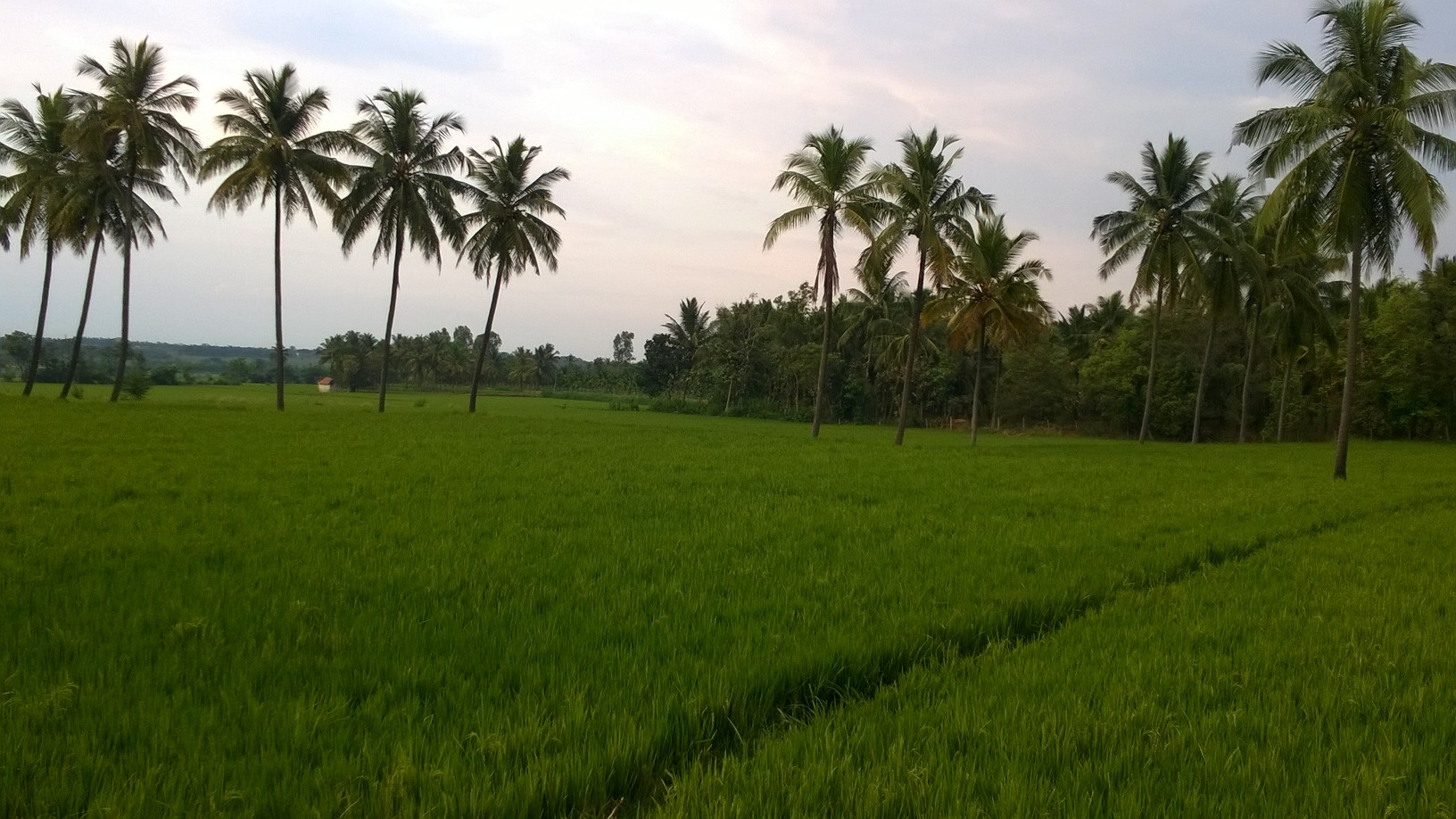
Irrigated paddy fields near Shamanur

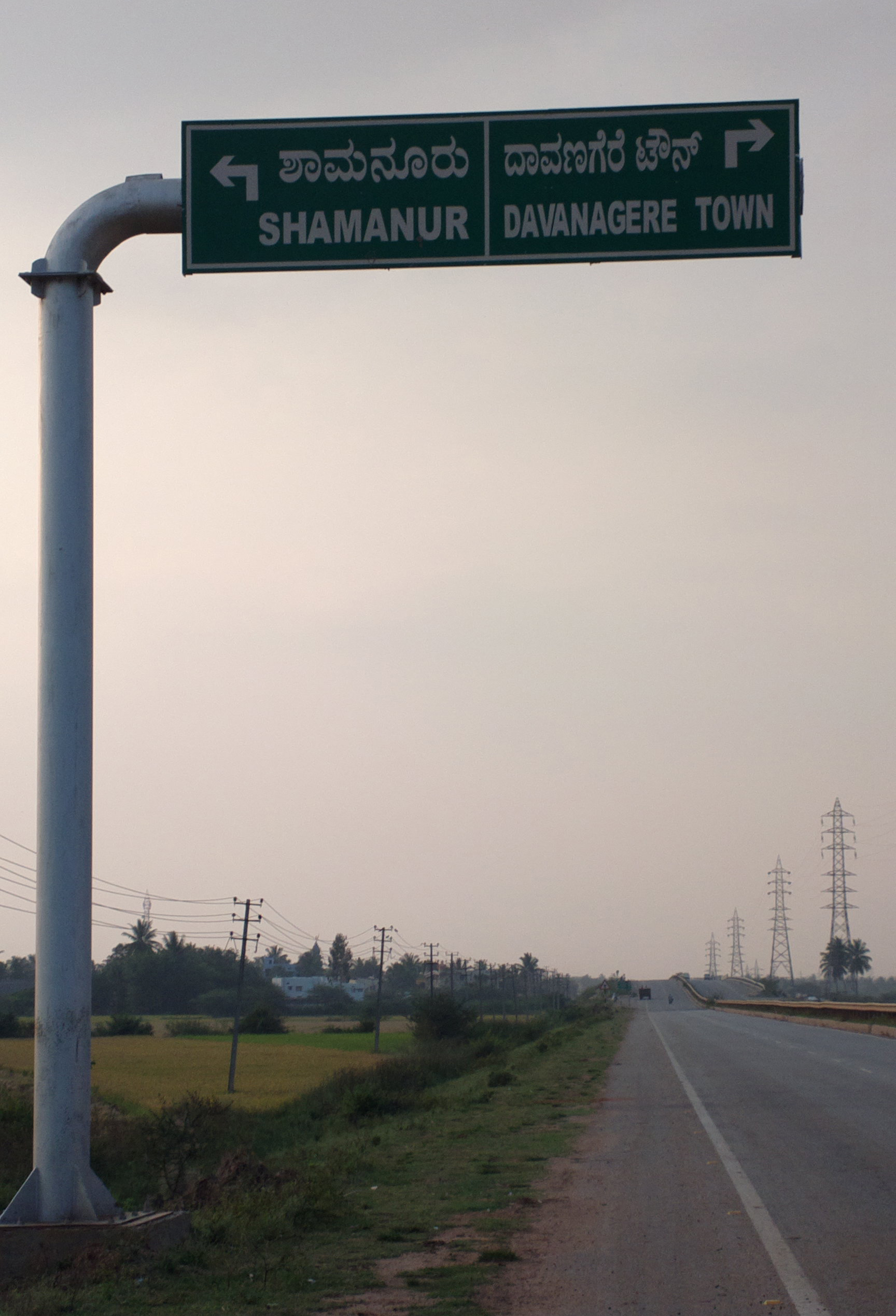
Board on National Highway 48, showing directions for Shamanur and Davanagere City.

== See also ==
- Davangere
- Sri Anjaneya Swamy Temple, Shamanur
