= Sri Anjaneya Swamy Temple, Shamanur =

Sri Anjaneya Swamy Temple
- Shabanuru
- Location in Karnataka

Religion
- Affiliation: Hinduism
- District: Davanagere
- Deity: Hanuman

Location
- Location: Shabanur, Davangere
- State: Karnataka
- Country: India
- Interactive map of Sri Anjaneya Swamy Temple
- Coordinates: 14.4666°N 75.9242°E

Architecture
- Creator: Vyasaraya

Sri Anjaneya Swamy Temple is the main attraction of the Shabanur village near Davangere, Karnataka, India. Lord Hanuman is the presiding deity of the temple.

Idol of Sri Anjaneya Swamy inside Sanctum Sanctorum

== History ==
The temple traces its origin with the history of Shabanur village around 800 years ago installed by Shri Vyasaraja swami.

== Description ==
The temple was renovated in the year 2000. A new Dravidian style temple was erected in place of the old temple with the overwhelming co-operation of villagers and Davangere people. The temple was inaugurated by Dr. Shivamurthy Shivacharya Mahaswamiji of Taralabalu Jagadguru Brihanmath, Sirigere on 11 March 2000. The temple houses Lord Hanuman which is the village deity of Shabanur. The Sanctum Sanctorum houses the main idol of Hanuman which is about 6 foot tall and is the centre of worship. The temple also serves Davangere people for worship and is crowded especially on Saturdays.

== Festival ==
Every year a car festival (Rathothsav) is held for 3 days starting from the tenth day after Mahashivratri.

== See also ==
- Davangere
- Shabanur
