= Sultanipura =

- village
- Location in Karnataka, India Sultanipura (India)
- Coordinates: 14.355815°N 76.050287°E
- Country: India
- State: Karnataka
- District: Davanagere
- Talukas: Davangere

Government
  - Body: Gram panchayat

Population (2011)
  - Total: 350

Languages
  - Official: Kannada
- Time zone: UTC+5:30 (IST)
- Telephone code: 08192
- Vehicle registration: KA17
- Nearest city: Davangere
- Literacy: 70-80 (Approximately)%
- Lok Sabha constituency: Davangere
- Vidhan Sabha constituency: Mayakonda

Sultanipura is a village in the Taluk and District of Davangere, Karnataka in India. It is located 20 kilometres from Davangere. It is one of the smallest villages in davangere, with around 50-60 families in total.

== Demographics ==
As of 2011, it had a population of about 300–350.

== History ==
It is popular in the Mayakonda hobli for having a fort inside the village, which is believed to have been constructed 300–400 years ago, but it was destroyed in recent years due to improper maintenance and heavy rainfall.

The village is also famous for the migration of most of its native residents to semi-urban areas like Davangere, Chitradurga, Bangalore, and near by towns. It is believed that more than 50% of its population has migrated to date. The village is also famous for its agricultural activities.
