= Taralabalu Jagadguru Brihanmath, Sirigere =

Educational organisation in Sirigere, India

Shree Taralabalu Jagadguru Brihanmath
- Interactive map of Shree Taralabalu Jagadguru Brihanmath
- Denomination: Lingayatism

People
- Founder: Viswabandhu Marulasiddha
- Important associated figures: Shivamurthy Shivacharya Mahaswamiji (head)

Site
- Location: Sirigere
- Coordinates: 14.283845°N 76.204406°E,
- Website: taralabalu.net

Sri Taralabalu Jagadguru Brihanmath is an organization in Sirigere, India. Sadar Lingayats, a dominant sub sect of Lingayat community, owe their allegiance to this math. It is well known in Karnataka for its yeoman service in the field of rural education. Under the auspices of this organization are running more than 172 institutions right from nursery to the Engineering College all over the State of Karnataka. Nearly 32 thousand students are studying in various schools and colleges of this organization which is one of the biggest private Educational Organization in Karnataka. More than 6,000 students are provided with free boarding and lodging.

== History of the Brihanmath ==
Sri Taralabalu Jagadguru Brihanmath, Sirigere is situated in Chitradurga district and is having a very large number of followers. It was founded by saint Marulasiddha popularly known as Viswabandhu Marulasiddha (Kannada: ವಿಶ್ವಬಂಧು ಮರುಳಸಿದ್ದ) during the 12th century. The saint blessed his successor with the divine words "Tarala ! Balu !" (Long Live! My Lad!) and that is how the pontiffs of this sacred seat are came to be known as "Sri Taralabalu Jagadguru". True to the spirit of the blessings of their founder, the pontiffs of this Brihanmath have been rendering yeoman service for the upliftment of the society for the last eight centuries. The Reservation to the scheduled caste/tribe people and other backward communities was given even before independence under the guidance of Sri Taralabalu Shivakumara swamiji. Many students belonging to these communities were benefited by the mutt.

== Present swamiji ==
The present pontiff of the Brihanmath is Dr. Shivamurthy Shivacharya Mahaswamiji (Kannada: ಡಾ. ಶಿವಮೂರ್ತಿ ಶಿವಾಚಾರ್ಯ ಮಹಾಸ್ವಾಮೀಜಿ)who succeeded to this religious seat in the year 1979. The swamiji is an eminent Sanskrit scholar with Ph.D. from Banaras Hindu University, is a university by himself thanks to the enormous literary achievements of him. He is also the President of the Education Society. Treading the path of his predecessor, the Swamiji has been relentlessly striving for the upliftment of the rural poor and the downtrodden. He has been contributing to the society in many ways and accessible to common man by writing weekly column(Every Thursday) in well known Kannada daily under the caption "Bisilu Beladingalu". The collection of these articles are also available in serious of books published by "Taralabalu Prakashana" as well as in Mutt's website www.taralabalu.org.

== Location ==
Sirigere is situated on the Poona–Bangalore National Highway (NH4). It is at distance of 227 km from Bengaluru and 95 km from Shimoga. This is located between Chitradurga(27 km), the District Headquarters, and Davangere (50 km). It can be easily recognized while travelling on the National Highway No.4 by the presence of an attractive arch on the western side. Sirigere is just 6 km from this Arch.
