= Kodada Gudda =

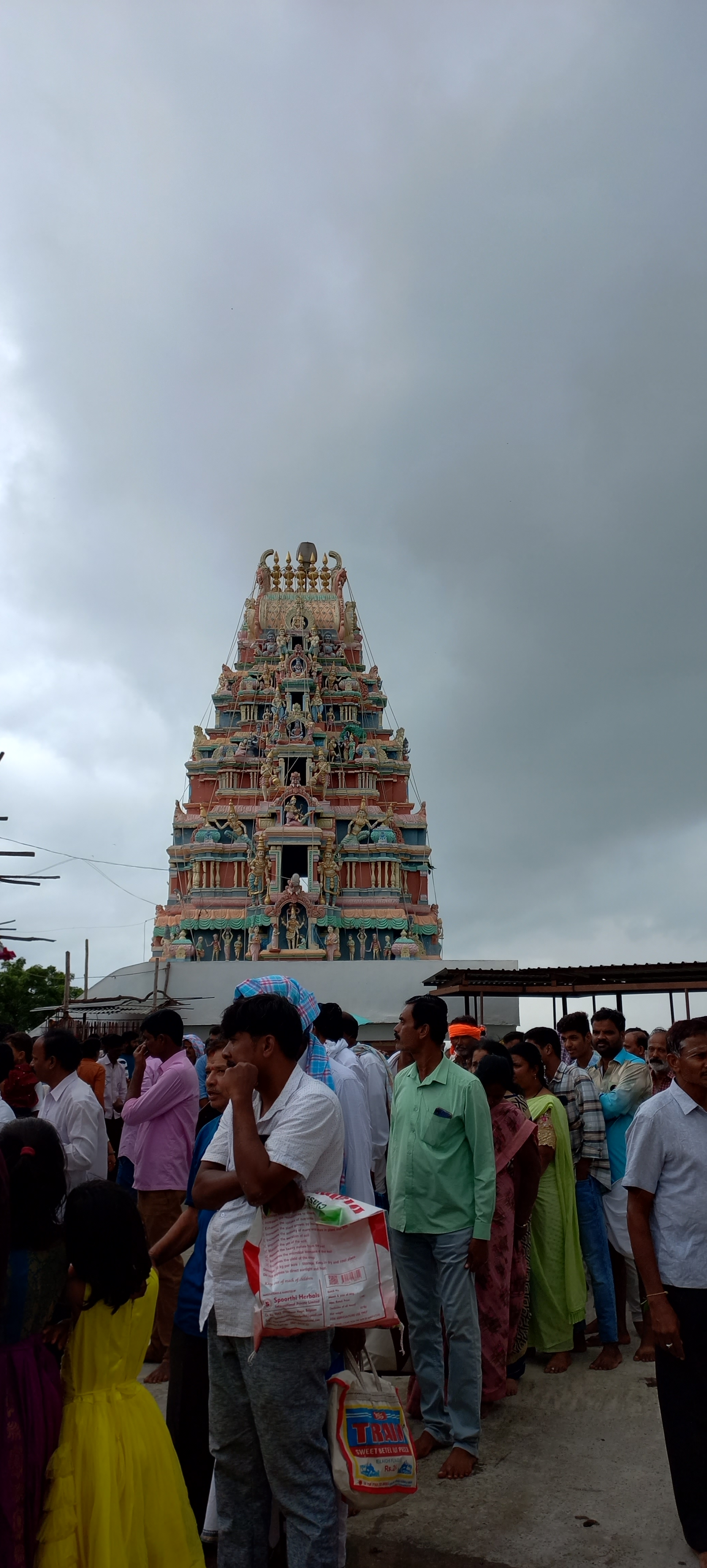

Kodada Gudda is a pilgrimage place and temple located on a hill near Devikere village in Jagalur taluk, district of Davanagere, Karnataka in southern, India. The temple is situated on the top of the hill dedicated to Lord Veerabhadhreshwara. Udbhavamurti of Sri Veerabhadra Swamy is worshipped here. This temple is the most popular devotional centre in the whole state of Karnataka. Sri Kaalamma temple is also present on the hill. Every newmoon day lot of devotees comes for darshana and blessings. In the month of April ( usually one day after Holi hunnime) car festival will be performed since ages. At least 25000 people witness this grand procession. A committee headed by Sri Rudresh Gowdru (ph .no. 9880877058) oversees the development of this Punya Kshetra.

== See also ==
- Jagalur
- Davanagere
- Districts of Karnataka
