= Bullapur =

Village in Karnataka, India

Bullapur is a village located in Davangere district of Karnataka state, India.
