= Bhimeshvara Temple, Nilagunda =

Shaiva temple at Davanagere, India

Bhimeshvara Temple
- Village
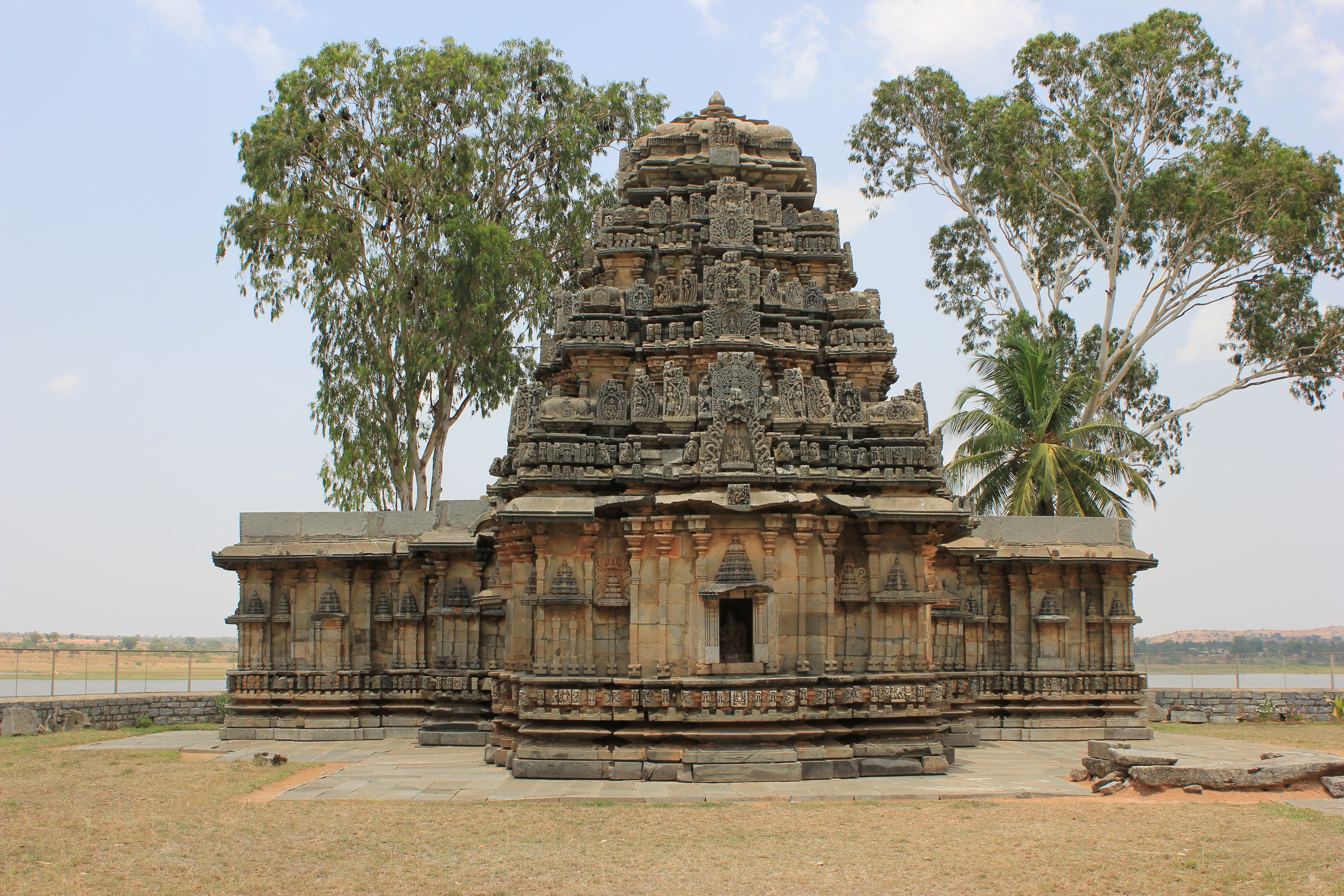
- Bhimeshvara temple (1075-1100 AD) at Nilagunda in Davangere district

- Location within Karnataka
- Coordinates: 14°17′N 76°05′E
- Country: India
- State: Karnataka
- District: Davanagere district
- Taluk: Harpanahalli
- Lok Sabha Constituency: Davanagere

Languages
  - Official: Kannada
- Time zone: UTC+5:30 (IST)

The Bhimeshvara temple (also spelt Bhimesvara or Bhimeshwara) is a temple in the town of Nilagunda (also spelt Neelagunda) in the Davangere district of Karnataka state, India.

== Bhimeshvara Temple ==
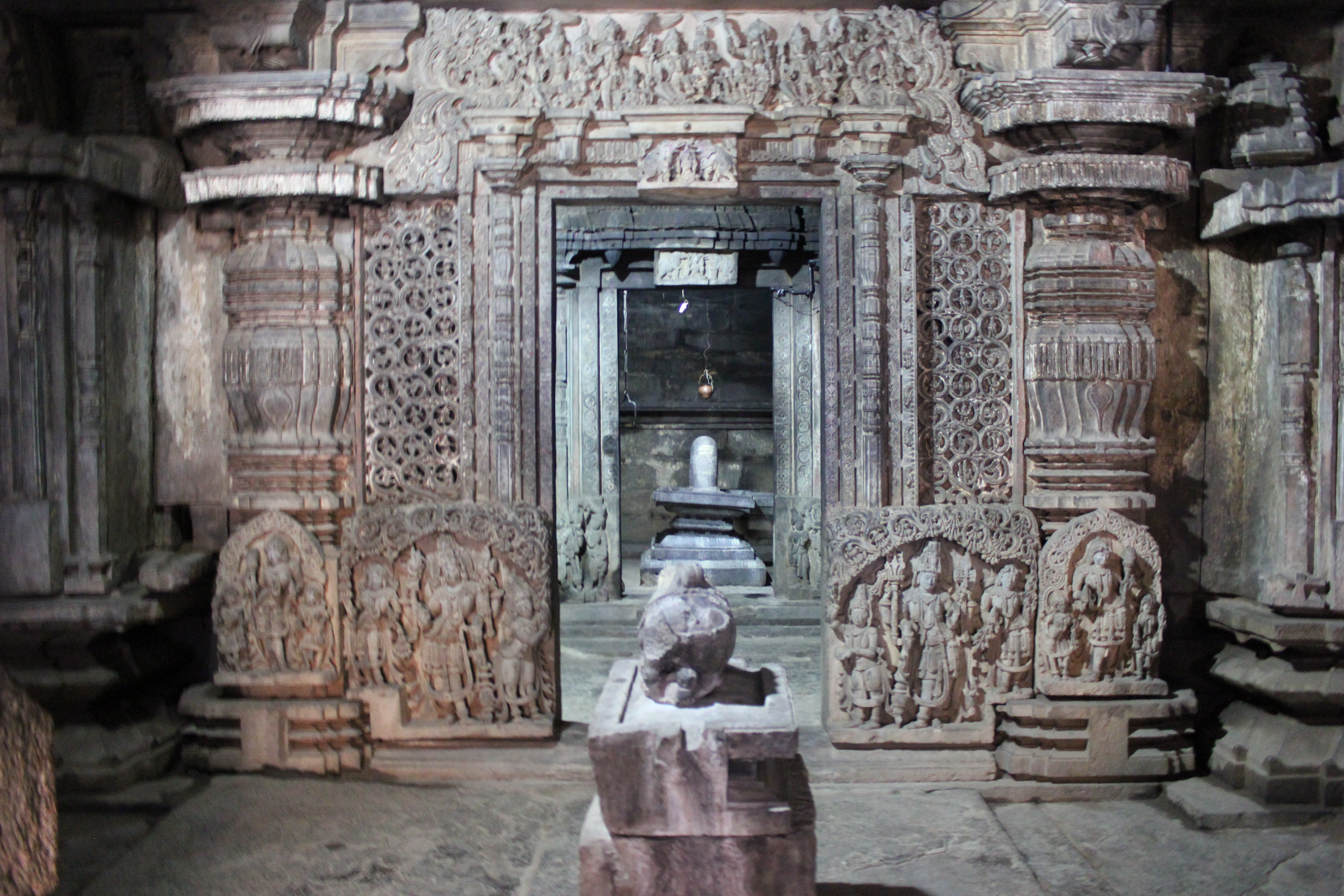
Decorative lintel and door jamb at entrance to vestibule in the Bhimeshvara temple at Nilagunda

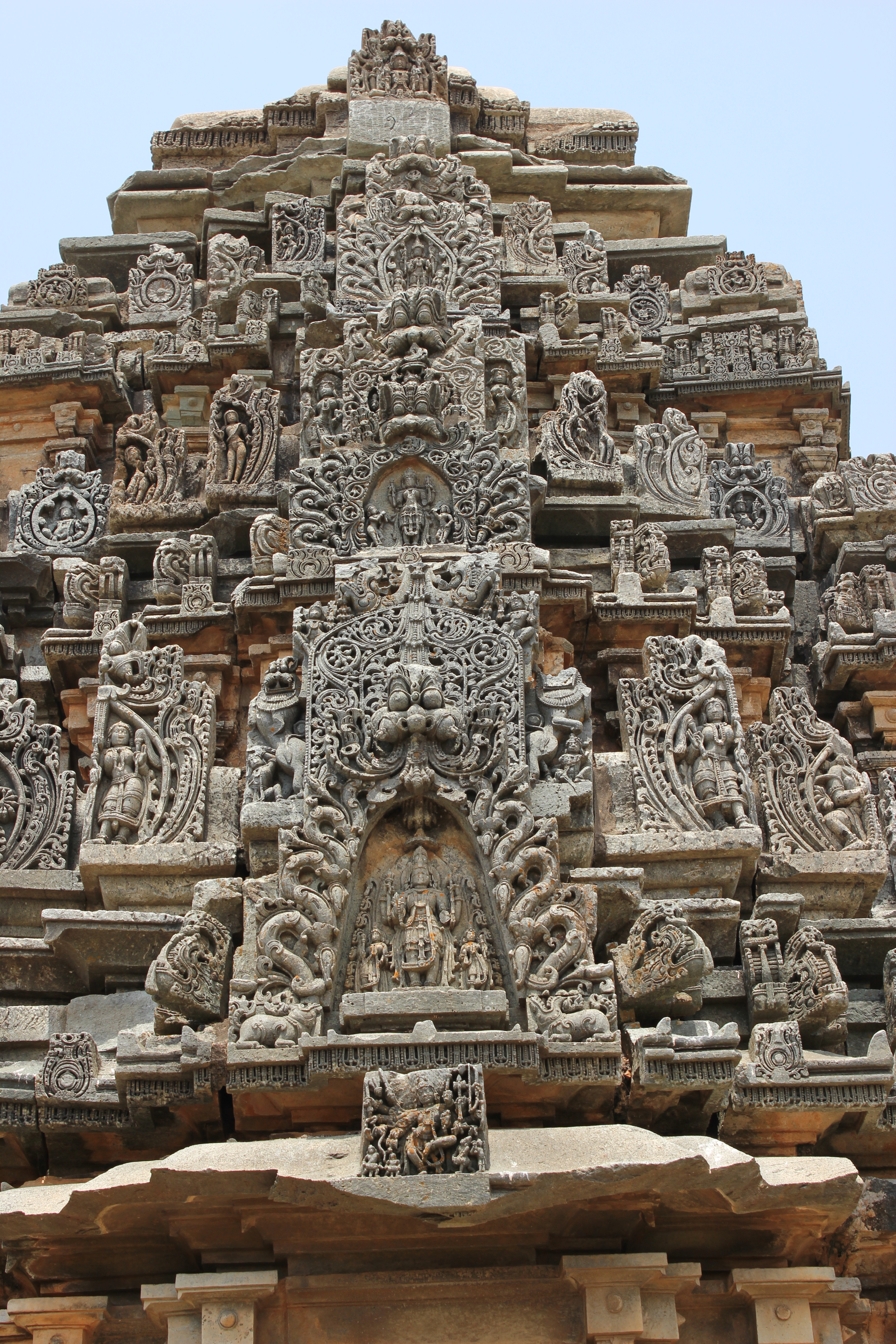
Kirtimukha relief sculpture on tiered superstructure over shrine in the Bhimeshvara temple at Nilagunda

According to the Archaeological Survey of India, the construction of the temple was undertaken in the last quarter of the 11th century during the rule of the Western Chalukyas (also known as Kalyani or Later Chalukyas) over the region. Art historian Adam Hardy dates the temple to the 12th century and classifies the architectural style as "Later Chalukya, non-mainstream", with Hoysala influences. The temple has four sanctums (chatuskuta vimana) with a superstructure (shikhara) surviving only over the main west facing shrine. The building material is soapstone. The temple is protected as a monument of national importance by the Archaeological Survey of India.

== Temple plan and decoration ==
Of the four sanctums in the temple, the ones in the north, west and south each have a vestibule (called antarala) and a common hall (called sabhamantapa or just mantapa). The common hall opens to a porch entrance (called mukhamantapa) in the east which has a minor fourth shrine attached to it. The entrance to the porch is a lateral one. According to the historian Kamath, Western Chalukya temples usually exhibit vesara style superstructure (called shikhara), and this is confirmed by the Archaeological Survey of India which designates the overall plan as vesara (a fusion of south and north Indian styles). The superstructure is a 3-tiered tower (called tritala).

The outer wall of the temple has projections and recesses creating niches. In these niches are miniature decorative towers in relief (called aedicula or turrets), the execution of which evolved during the Later Chalukya rule. The Vesara style aedicula are supported by double pilasters while the Dravida (south Indian) style aedicula is supported by single pilasters. The art historian Percy Brown calls the Later Chalukyan style of wall decoration "exceptionally well rendered", and according to Kamath, the miniature towers are wrought in a "most artistic refrain". Each tier of the superstructure has a kirtimukha (gargoyle like face). Below each kirtimukha, is a relief of a deity such as the Nataraja or Maheshvara (both forms of the Hindu god Shiva). Worthy of mention is the ornate relief on the lintel and door jamb at the entrance to each sanctum (garbhagriha) which exhibit Saiva dvarapalas ("guardians" to a shrine of the god Shiva) flanked by female umbrella (chauri) bearers. Facing the west sanctum is a small sculpture of Nandi the bull. There are sculptures of various deities from the Hindu pantheon in the niches in the interior wall of the temple, such as Ganesh (elephant headed god of "beginnings" in Hinduism), Mahishasuramardhini (a form of Durga) and the Saptamatrika (the seven Hindu goddesses). The ceiling in the common hall is supported by four polished lathe turned pillars, which according to Kamath is also a characteristic feature of Western Chalukya temples.

== Gallery ==
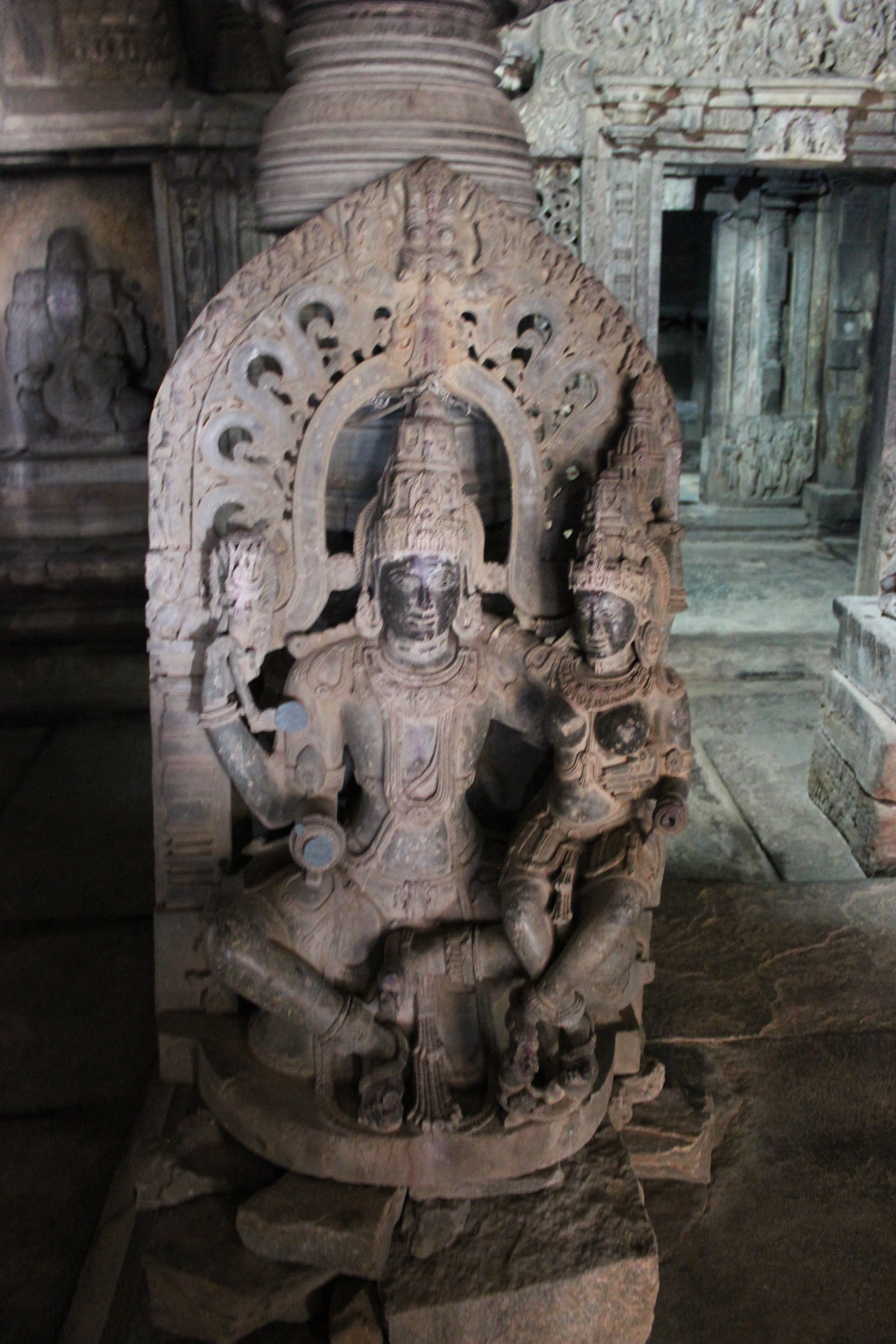
Sculpture of Shiva and Parvati in the mantapa of the Bhimeshvara temple at Nilagunda

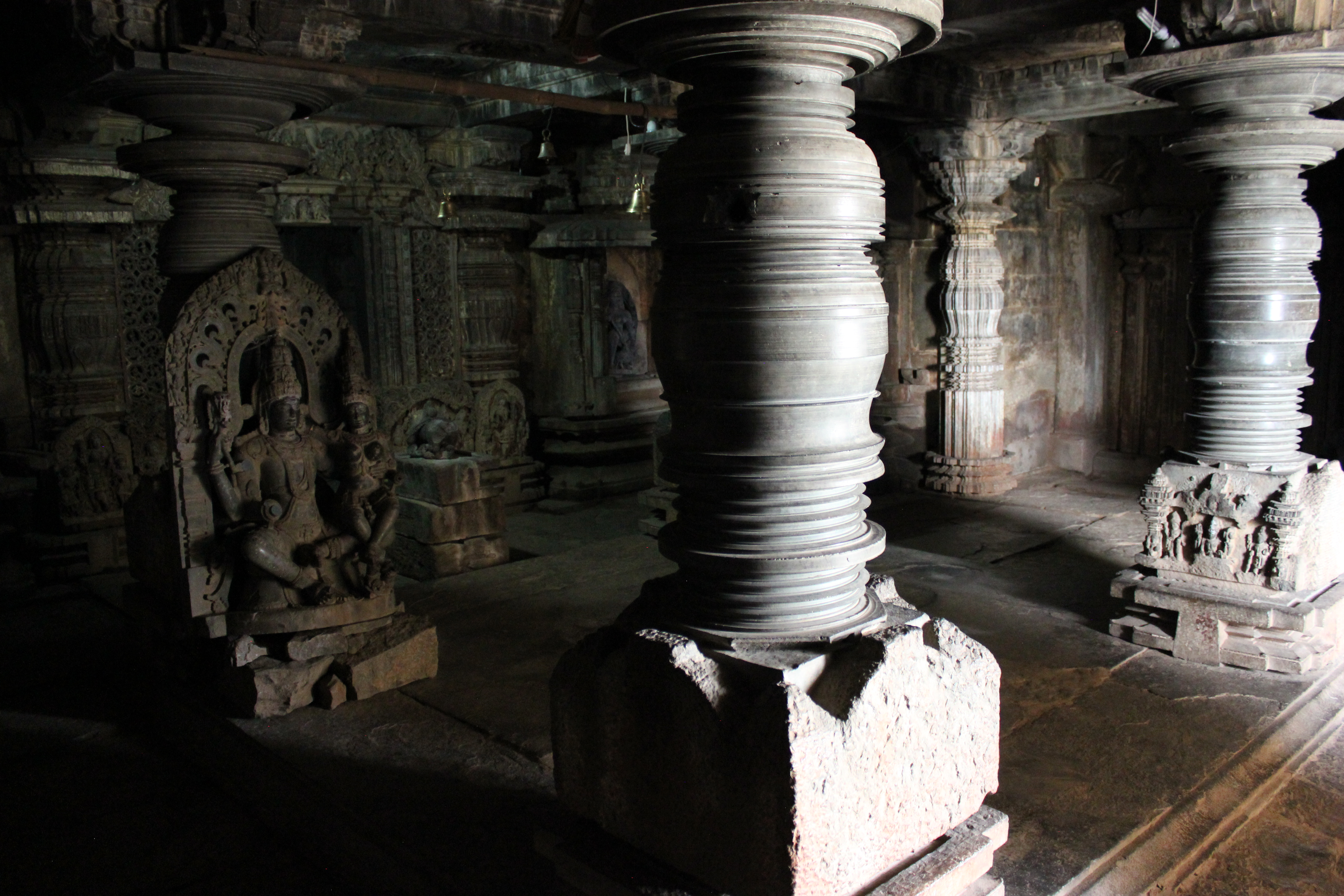
Mantapa with lathe turned pillarssupporting bay ceiling in the Bhimeshvara temple at Nilagunda

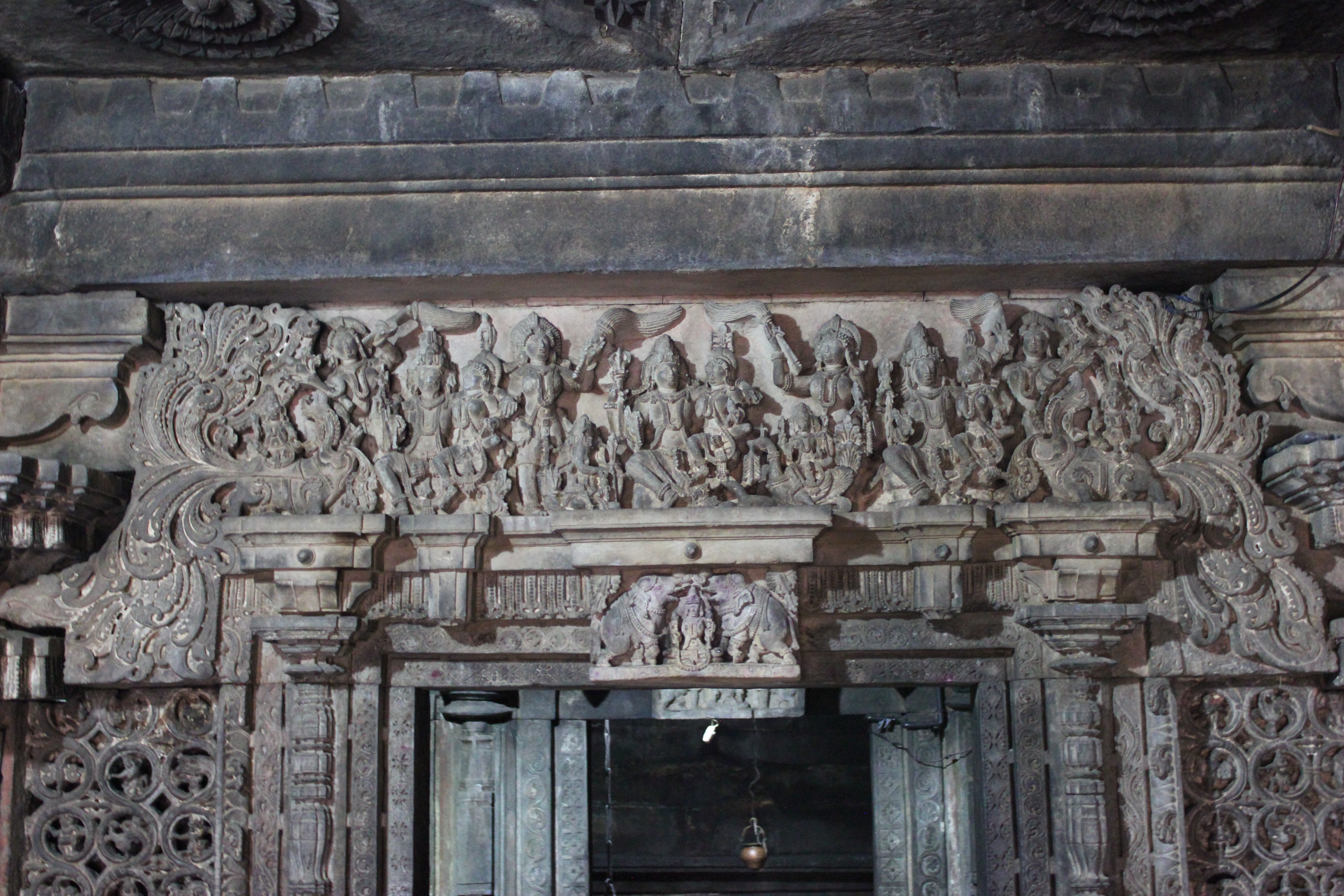
Close up of the lintel over shrine entrance in the Bhimeshvara temple at Nilagunda

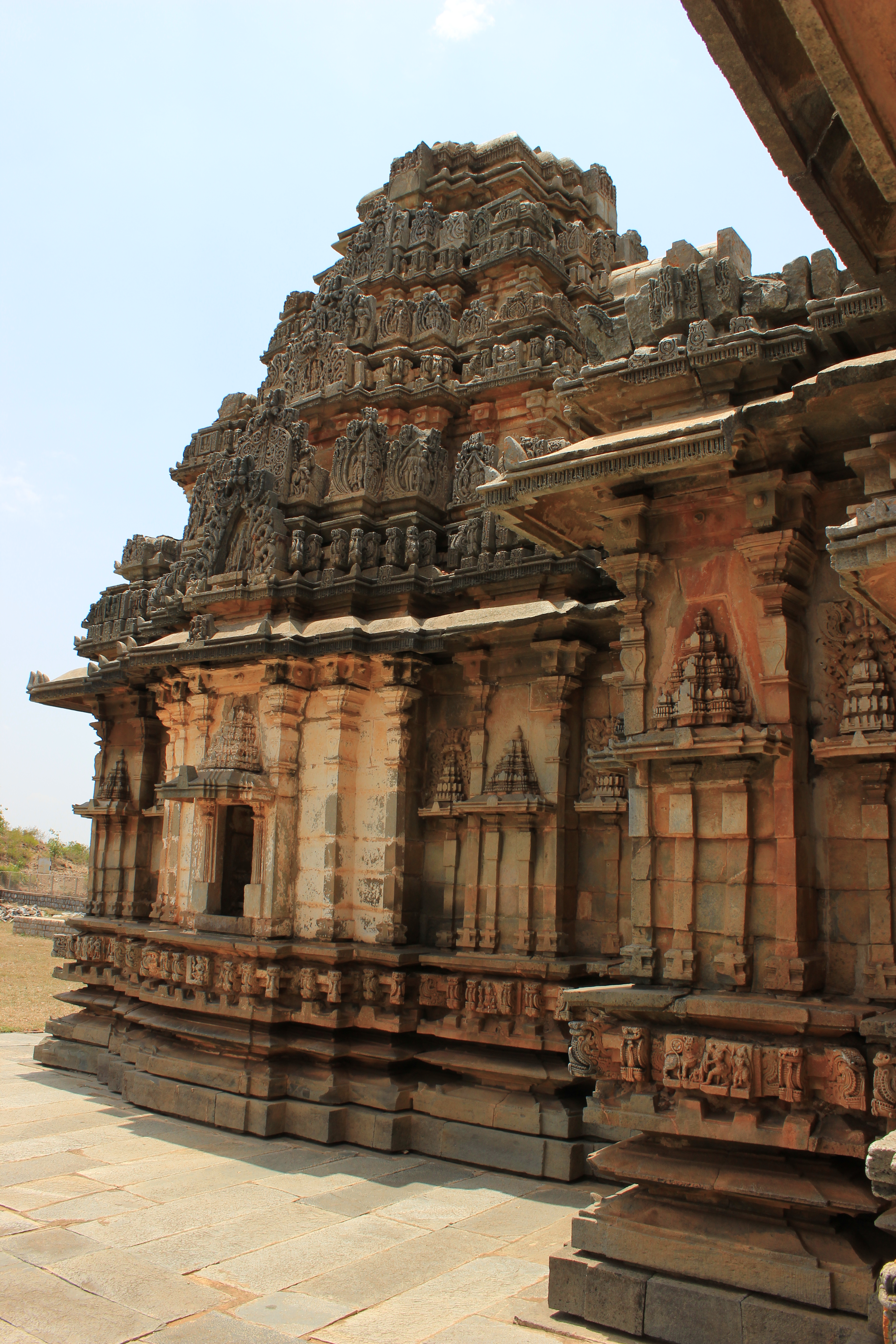
Profile of the Bhimeshvara temple at Nilagunda

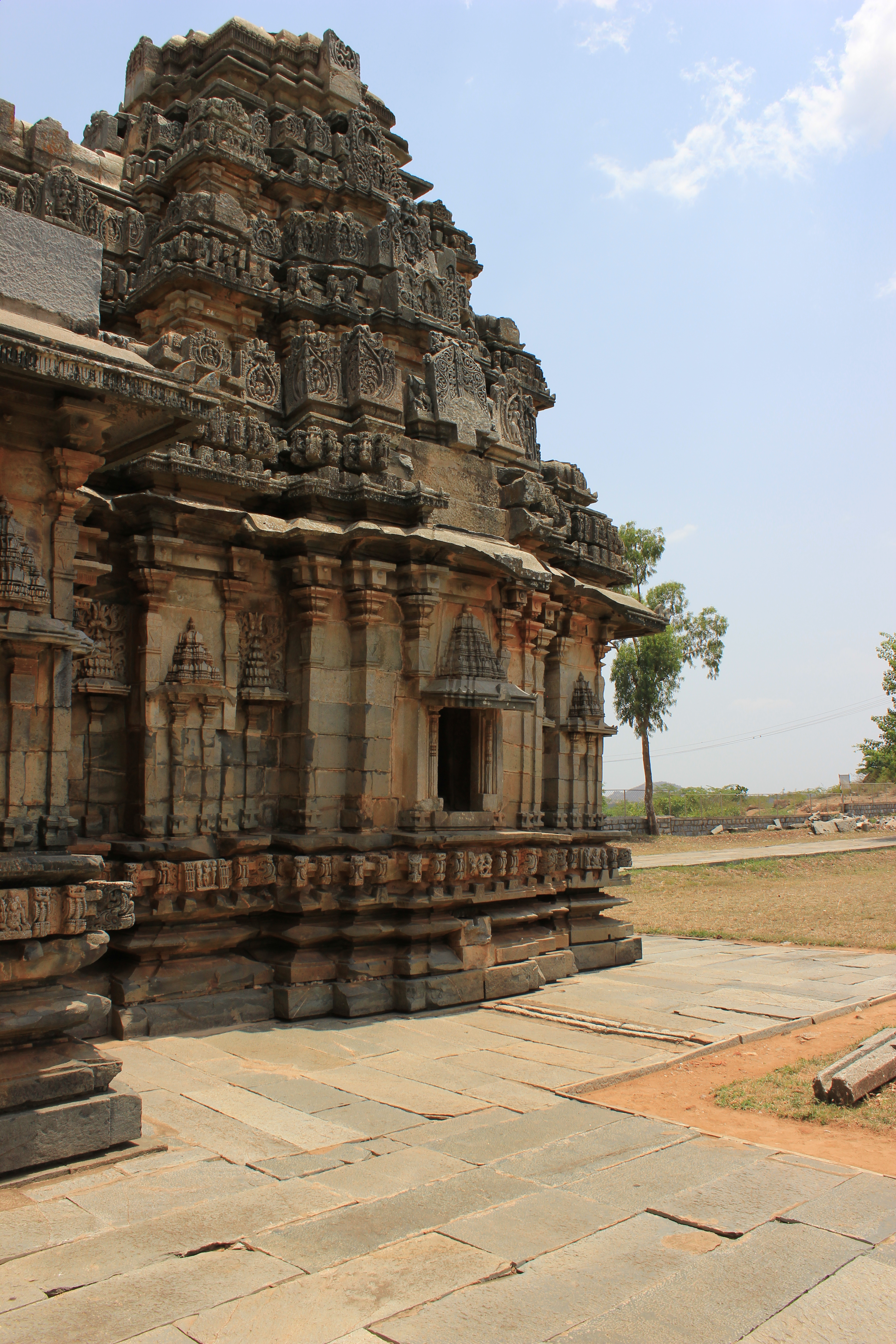
Profile of the Bhimeshvara temple at Nilagunda

== See also ==
- Kalleshvara Temple, Bagali
