= Gonivada =

Coordinates: 14°18′N 75°54′E

Gonivada Gonivada
- village
- Interactive map of Gonivada
- Country: India
- State: Karnataka

Languages
  - Official: Kannada
- Time zone: UTC+5:30 (IST)

Gonivada is a small village, 20 km from Davangere in Karnataka state in India. It is well connected by Davangere-Shimoga Karnataka state highway. The main occupation of the villagers is agriculture, the same as thousands of other villages in India. The land is semi-fertile with black and red soil. The chief agricultural product is paddy rice, followed by sugarcane as there is a sugar factory nearby. Off late, areca nut cultivation is also quite popular due to commercial benefits. The population of the village is around 2000.
