= Taralabalu Badavane =

Taralabalu Badavane is an area in the city of Davanagere, Karnataka, India. The meaning of this area name is "live happily forever". This name is told by Basavanna.
