= National Highway 369 (India) =

National highway in India

National Highway 369
- Map of National Highway 369 in red

Route information
- Length: 105 km (65 mi)

Major junctions
- From: Bhadravathi
- To: Chitradurga

Location
- Country: India
- Primary destinations: Channagiri – Holalkere

Highway system
- Roads in India; Expressways; National; State; Asian
← NH 69	→ NH 48

National Highway 369 (NH 369) is a national highway in India.
