= Sadar Lingayats =

Lingayat community in Karnataka, India

- Religions: Originally Jainism, later Lingayatism
- Languages: Kannada
- Region: Karnataka, Andhra Pradesh
- Population: 400,00–500,000
- Related groups: Jains, Lingayats, Veerashaivas, Vokkaliga

Notes
- Historically classified as Jains in the 1901 Census.

Sadar Lingayats (ಸಾದರ ಲಿಂಗಾಯತ) is a sub-caste of Lingayats, the community that inhabit Central Karnataka region of the Karnataka state in India. The community, also called as ʼʼSadaruʼʼ or ʼʼSadaru Okkaligasʼʼ, is a cultivating caste and were once acted as a native militia and were into trading of grains. The land-owning feudal community vows its allegiance to Taralabalu Jagadguru Brihanmath, Sirigere. It is one of the dominant sub-castes of the Lingayat community. They are politically strong and among the richest sects in Lingayatism. However, historical and colonial records suggest that they were originally adherents of Jainism. The community uses honorific surname Gowda or Gauda. Desai, Patel, Patil and Bommai are some of the prominent surnames used by the community. They are mostly found in Davangere, Vijayanagara, Haveri, Chitradurga, Shivamogga, Ballari, Bagalkot, and Hubbali-Dharwad districts of Karnataka. They were considered as one of the component caste or an ethnic group under the Vokkaliga Community, as per the Mysore Gazetteer.

== History ==
The Sadar Lingayat community, now identified as followers of the Lingayatism, But before the 19th Century were originally Jains by faith and practice. They converted to Lingayatism in The 18th Century By Lingayat Priests. Non-lingayat Sadars do exist who strictly adhere to Vedic Hindu religion. The Sadhu Lingayats initially lived in the northern part of India, where agriculture was their primary livelihood. When a local king attacked the region some of these people moved south. Later, others following them south converted to Lingayathism. Haalu Rameshwara, Viswabandhu Marulasiddha, Narappa, Mahdeswara, Karibasajja and Dyamalamba are noted saints of the community, and Harihara and Raghavanka are some noted poets.

The non-Lingayats are divided into Huvvinavaru ("Those of flowers") and Hongeyavaru ("Those of the Honge Mara"). The community had a high social status due to their strict vegetarianism and observance of sexual ethics. They adopted the usual Kattemane form of caste organization. They use the caste title Gowda.

== Occupation ==
Their primary occupations are Landowners, agriculture, Education, And Clothing & Textiles businesses, and also in animal husbandry, Small-Scale industries. some have become traders and are into Government services. Most of the Patils, Patels And Desai's are village headmen of the villages.

== Census records ==
According to the 1901 Indian Census, Sadar Lingayats were recorded as Jains. despite their growing association with the Lingayat community. This classification has been cited in modern studies on religious identity fluidity and caste mobility in colonial and post-colonial Karnataka.

== Cultural Practices ==
While the community now largely follows Lingayat customs, some older Jain influences remain in their ritual purity rules, vegetarianism, and attitudes toward monastic life. In some rural areas, Sadar Lingayats still venerate Jain tirthankaras alongside Lingayat saints.

== Clans ==
The population comprises 365 known clans. Some notable clans are Gowdloru, Mattelleru, Monnelleru, Shavantloru, Adikelleru, Shattelleru, Shakrannaru, Malligeru, Hullaleru and Tandasloru. Another popular clan is tolagadavaru (ತೊಲಗದವರು)
