= Hadadi =

Haddadi
- village
- Location in Karnataka, India Haddadi (India)
- Coordinates: 14°22′N 75°54′E
- Country: India
- State: Karnataka
- District: Davanagere
- Talukas: Davanagere

Area
  - Total: 2 km^{2} (0.77 sq mi)

Population (2001)
  - Total: 5,303
  - Density: 2,700/km^{2} (6,900/sq mi)

Languages
  - Official: Kannada
- Time zone: UTC+5:30 (IST)
- Postal code: 577525

Hadadi is a village in the southern state of Karnataka, India. It is located in the Davanagere taluk of Davanagere district.

== Demographics ==
As of 2001 India census, Hadadi had a population of 5303 with 2701 males and 2602 females.

== Terrain ==
The land around Hadadi is flat. The highest area in the area has an altitude of 798 meters and is 18.4 km southwest of Hadadi. There are about 683 people per square kilometer around Hadadi which is very population. The nearest larger town is Davangere, 12.0 km north of Hadadi. The area around Hadadi is almost covered in fields.

== See also ==
- Davanagere
- Districts of Karnataka
