= Kundavada Kere =

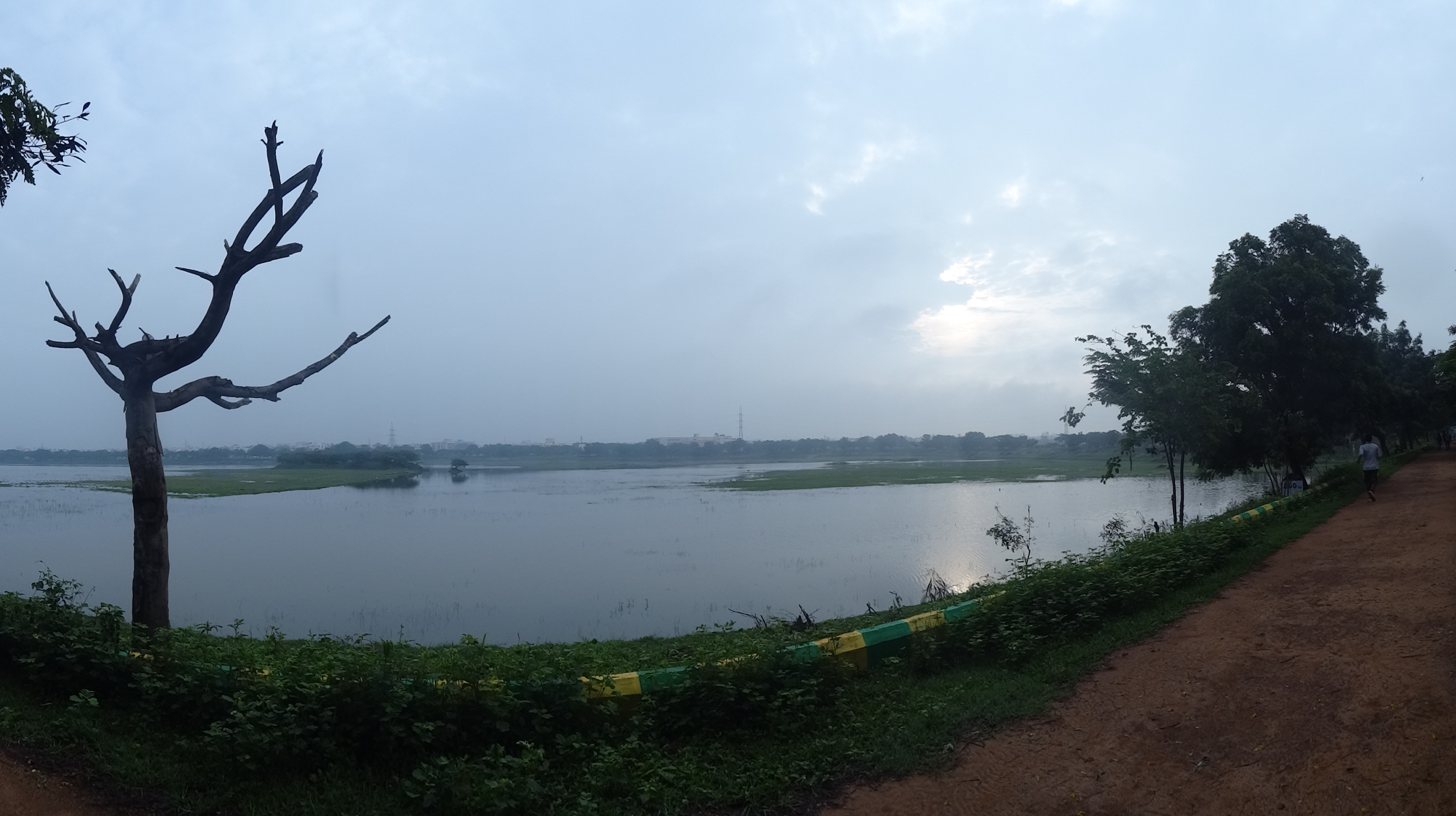

- Location within Karnataka Location within India
- Location: Davanagere city, Karnataka state, India
- Coordinates: 14.456°N 75.890°E
- Type: lake

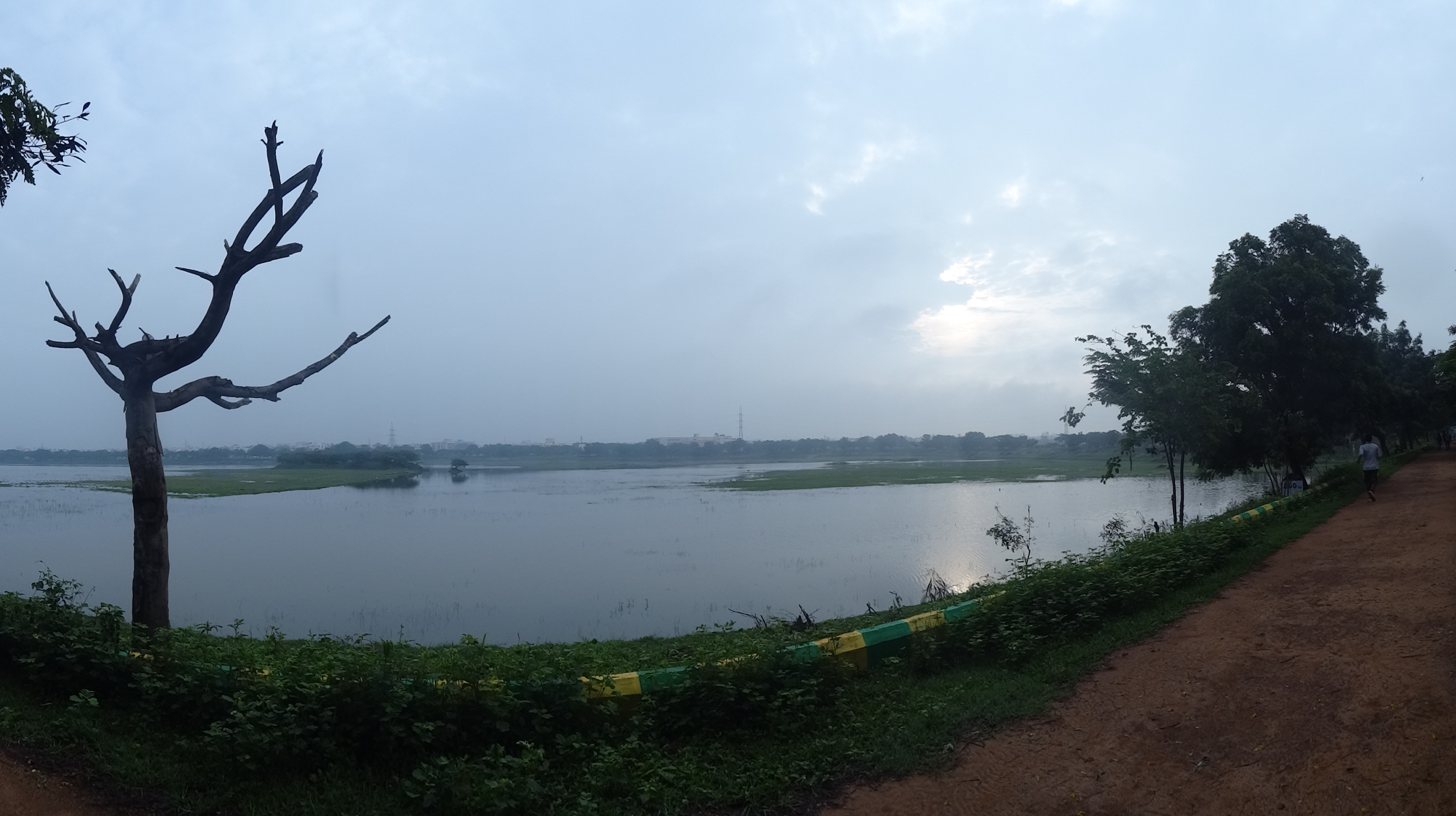
Kundawada Lake(Lake), Davanagere, Karnataka State

Kundavada Kere is a lake in Davanagere city, Karnataka state, India.
