= Benne dose =

Type of dosa from Karnataka, India

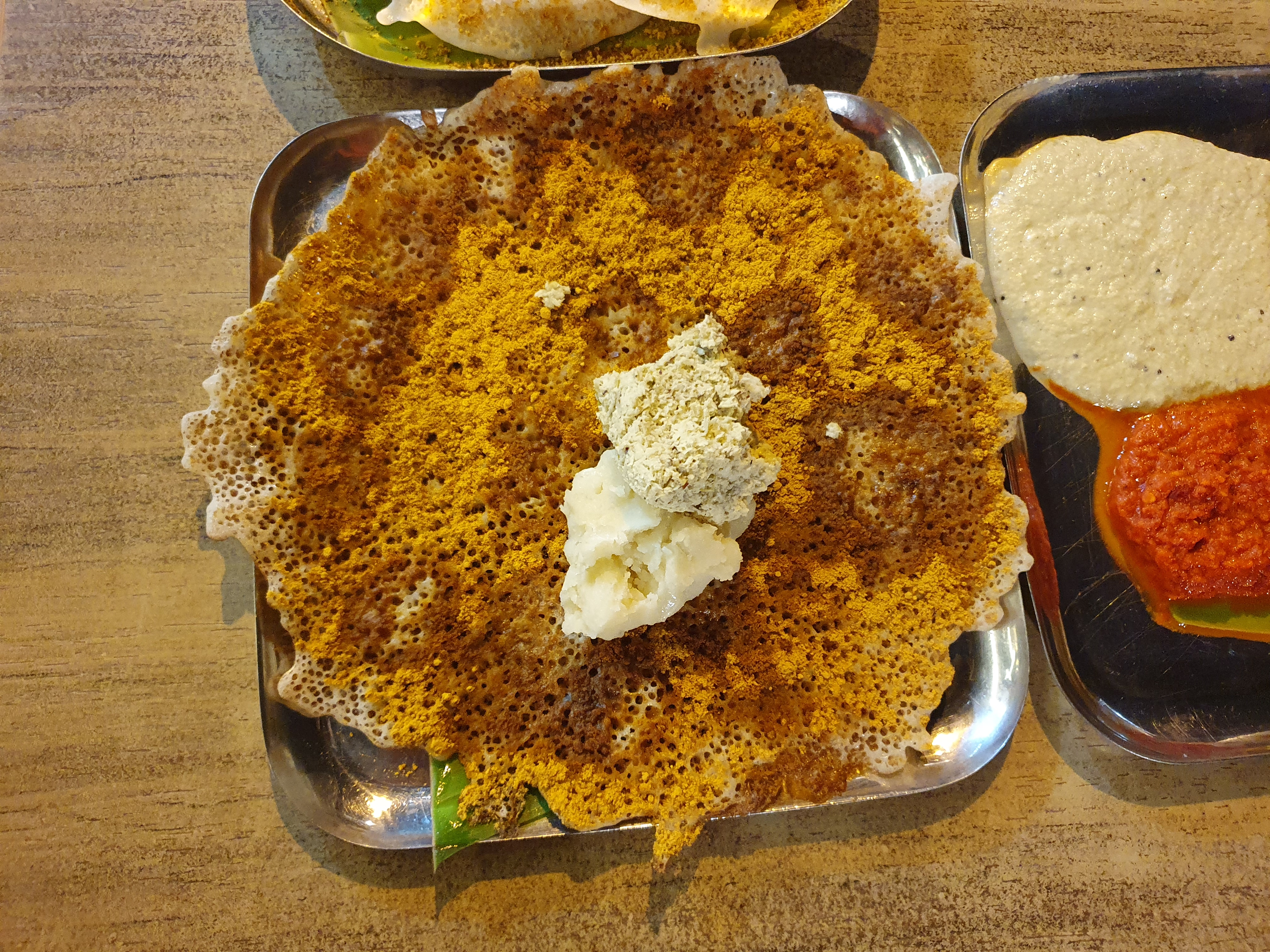
- Davanagere benne dosa
- Alternative names: Butter dosa
- Place of origin: India
- Region or state: Karnataka
- Main ingredients: Rice batter, butter

Benne dose (Kannada: beṇṇe dhōse), also known as butter dosa, is a South Indian rice crêpe dish originating in the city of Davanagere, Karnataka, India. A regional variety of dosa, it is prepared by incorporating butter into dosa batter, and is typically served with toppings of additional butter and coconut chutney. The batter consists of a mixture of parboiled rice, black gram and puffed rice, and is traditionally cooked on a wood-fired griddle. It is similar to masala dosa, but is usually smaller in size and characterized by its soft texture and generous use of butter.

Several variants of benne dose are popular in Bangalore and other regions of Karnataka. Since 2024, the dish has seen a rise in popularity in Mumbai, Delhi, and other urban centers in India.

== History ==
The precise origins of benne dose are unknown. In popular tradition, the origin of the dish is linked to a Kannadiga cook named Chennamma, who migrated from the village of Beedaki to Davangere in 1927. She established an eatery in front of the local Savalagi Drama Theatre and sold a variety of dosas prepared with finger millet flour and cooked in ghee, or clarified butter.

In the 1940s, Chennamma's eatery was inherited by her four sons. Two of them, Shanthappa and Mahadevappa, modified the original dosa batter mixture, replacing finger millet with rice flour due to the latter's ready availability in the area. The resulting recipe rapidly gained popularity in the city. In 1944, Shanthappa established a restaurant named Shantappa Dosa Hotel, considered one of the oldest benne dose eateries in the city. Mahadevappa established a separate eatery near Vasantha Theatre, which was later closed. Two of his sons, Ravi and Vijji, subsequently opened their own benne dose restaurants. In the following years, several benne dose eateries opened in Chamarajpet and nearby localities.

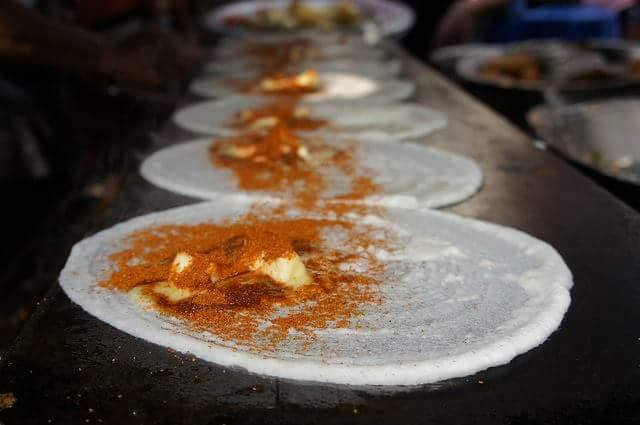
Benne dose prepared at a restaurant

In 2024, Prabha Mallikarjun, a Member of Parliament in the 18th Lok Sabha, attempted to obtain a Geographical Indication (GI) registration for the dish, tying its geographical origin to her district of Davangere. Jitin Prasada, the Minister of State for Commerce & Industry, ultimately denied the request, questioning the dish's "uniqueness" to the region of Davangere and noting its popularity in several districts across the state.

== See also ==
- Cuisine of Karnataka
- List of Indian breads

== See also ==
- Cuisine of Karnataka
