= Harakanahalu, Davanagere =

Village in Karnataka, India

Harakanahalu
- Village
- Location in Karnataka, India
- Coordinates: 14°45′51″N 76°15′54″E
- Country: India
- State: Karnataka
- District: Davanagere
- Talukas: Kudligi

Languages
  - Official: Kannada
- Time zone: UTC+5:30 (IST)
- Postal code: 583131

Harakanahalu is a village in Davanagere district, Karnataka, India.
