= Davanagere City Corporation =

Local civic body in Davanagere, Karnataka, India

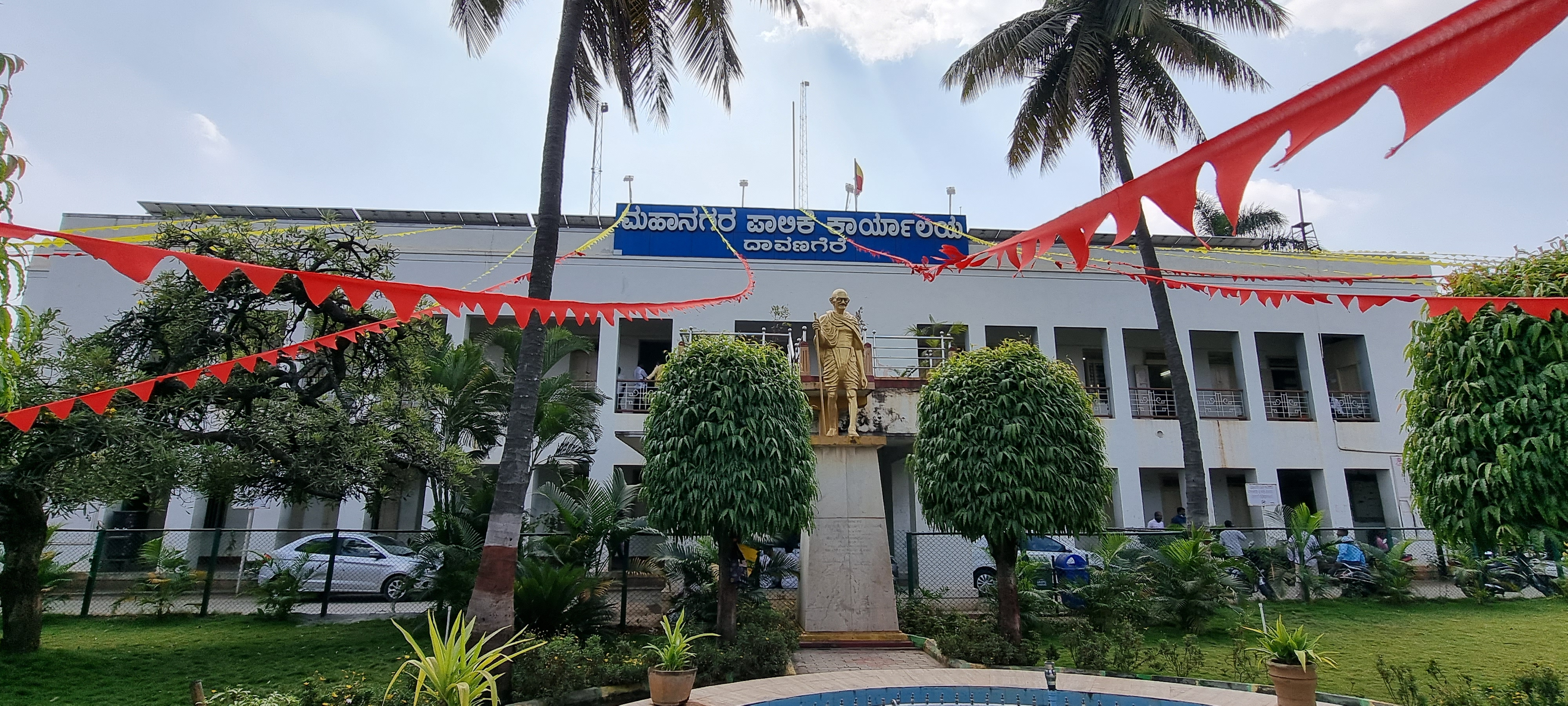

Type
- Type: Municipal Corporation

History
- Founded: 6 January 2007 (19 years ago)

Leadership
- Mayor: K. Chaman Sab
- Deputy Mayor: Shanthakumar Sogi
- Municipal Commissioner: Renuka, KMAS
- Seats: 45

Elections
- Voting system: First-past-the-post
- Last election: 2019
- Next election: TBD

Meeting place
- City Corporation office, P. B. Road, Davanagere – 577004, Karnataka, India

Website
- DCC

Footnotes
- Governed by: Karnataka Municipal Corporations Act, 1976

Davanagere City Corporation (DCC) is the civic organisation that manages the municipal affairs of Davanagere City in the Indian state of Karnataka. It is the 6th largest Urban Local Body in Karnataka. The town administration of Davanagere city was upgraded as a Municipality in c.1870 and later as a City Corporation on 6 January 2006. The Municipal Corporation mechanism in India was introduced during British Rule with the formation of municipal corporations in Madras (Chennai) in 1688, later followed by municipal corporations in Bombay (Mumbai) and Calcutta (Kolkata) by 1762. It has a territorial area of 68.63 km^{2} and a population of 4,34,971, as per the 2011 Census of India. The territorial limits of the City Corporation fall under the Davanagere North and Davanagere South legislative assembly constituencies.

== History of electoral results ==
SN	Party	Seats won (2013)	Seats won (2019)
1	Bharatiya Janata Party	01	17
2	Indian National Congress	38	22
3	Janata Dal (Secular)	00	01
4	Others	02	05
	Total	41	45

== Wards and organisational structure ==
Davanagere City Corporation's territory has been divided into 45 wards, each represented by an elected representative called a corporator. A mayor, who is the head of the institution and de facto first citizen of the city, and a deputy mayor, who is the mayor's deputy, are elected by these corporators yearly as per the roster of reservations from different social groups in compliance with the Government of Karnataka's affirmative action policy. The term of all corporators is five years, while that of each mayor and deputy mayor is one year. The jurisdictional Member of Legislative Assembly from Davanagere North and Davanagere South Assembly Constituencies, Member of Parliament from Davanagere Loksabha Constituency and Member of Legislative Council who reside in Davanagere city also have voting powers while electing mayor and deputy mayor, along with corporators.

Accompanying the mayor and the deputy mayor, four standing committees, each composed of corporators and headed by a chairman chosen among them from the ruling party, are constituted every year for monitoring various civic-related subjects – one each for Taxation, Finance and Appeals; Public Health, Education and Social justice; Town Planning and Reforms; and Accounts.

== Functions ==
Davangere Mahanagara Palike is created for the following functions:

- Planning for the town including its surroundings which are covered under its Department's Urban Planning Authority .
- Approving construction of new buildings and authorising use of land for various purposes.
- Improvement of the town's economic and Social status.
- Arrangements of water supply towards commercial, residential and industrial purposes.
- Planning for fire contingencies through Fire Service Departments.
- Creation of solid waste management, public health system and sanitary services.
- Working for the development of ecological aspect like development of Urban Forestry and making guidelines for environmental protection.
- Working for the development of weaker sections of the society like mentally and physically handicapped, old age and gender biased people.
- Making efforts for improvement of slums and poverty removal in the town.

== Revenue sources ==
The following are the Income sources for the Corporation from the Central and State Government.

=== Revenue from taxes ===
Following is the Tax related revenue for the corporation.

- Property tax.
- Profession tax.
- Entertainment tax.
- Grants from Central and State Government like Goods and Services Tax.
- Advertisement tax.

=== Revenue from non-tax sources ===
Following is the Non Tax related revenue for the corporation.

- Water usage charges.
- Fees from Documentation services.
- Rent received from municipal property.
- Funds from municipal bonds.

== See also ==
- Davanagere
- Bruhat Bengaluru Mahanagara Palike
