= Sirigere =

- village
- Country: India
- State: Karnataka
- District: Chitradurga
- Talukas: Chitradurga

Government
  - Body: Gram panchayat

Population (2001)
  - Total: 5,768

Languages
  - Official: Kannada
- Time zone: UTC+5:30 (IST)
- ISO 3166 code: IN-KA
- Vehicle registration: KA
- Website: karnataka.gov.in

Sirigere is a village in the southern state of Karnataka, India. It is located in the Chitradurga District.

As of 2001 India census, Sirigere had a population of 5768 with 2919 males and 2849 females.

== See also ==
- Davanagere
- Districts of Karnataka
