= Nilagunda =

- village
- Location in Karnataka, India Nilagunda (India)
- Coordinates: 15.9241°N 75.5486°E
- Country: India
- State: Karnataka
- District: Bagalkot

Languages
  - Official: Kannada
- Time zone: UTC+5:30 (IST)

Nilagunda is a village in Bagalkot district in Karnataka.
