= Shivamurthy Shivacharya Mahaswamiji =

Indian seer

Dr Shivamurthy Shivacharya Mahaswamiji (Kannada: ಡಾ. ಶಿವಮೂರ್ತಿ ಶಿವಾಚಾರ್ಯ ಮಹಾಸ್ವಾಮೀಜಿ) is the founder president of STJ education society and current seer of Taralabalu Jagadguru Brihanmath, Sirigere, (Kannada: ತರಳಬಾಳು ಜಗದ್ಗುರು ಬೃಹನ್ಮಠ, ಸಿರಿಗೆರೆ). He hails from Sugur village, Shimoga District.

== Education ==
He obtained PhD from Banaras Hindu University. Later pursued post doctoral research from University of Vienna.

== Publications ==
For more than four years, Shivamurthy Shivacharya Maha Swamiji has been writing a Weekly Column entitled "Bisilu Beladingalu" on every Thursday in Vijaya Karnataka, a Kannada newspaper.
