= Asandi =

Coordinates: 13.42°N 76.6°E

Asandi is a village in Kadur taluk, Chikkamagaluru district, Karnataka, India. It is situated 5 miles (8.0 km) from Ajjampura railway station.

== History ==
In ancient times it was a place of considerable importance. Under the Gangas (350–1000 CE) and the Hoysalas (1026–1343 CE) it was a chief city of a principality, which was governed by Vijayaditya, son of king Sripurusha, and in the 12th century and 13th century by a line of Ganga chiefs. Asandi was an importand Jain center as there was a Mulasthana-basadi at Asandi.

== Demographics ==
Asandi is a village panchayat containing the villages of Asandi, K.Chomanahalli, M.Chomanahalli, and Aadigere, with postal indication number code of 577550. The population of Asandi in 1901 was 1006. The 2001 Indian census recorded the population of Asandi as 2,938. Males constituted 49.9% of the population and females 50.9%. Kadur had an average literacy rate of 77.79%, higher than the national average of 59.5%: male literacy was 86.48%, and female literacy was 69.2%.
