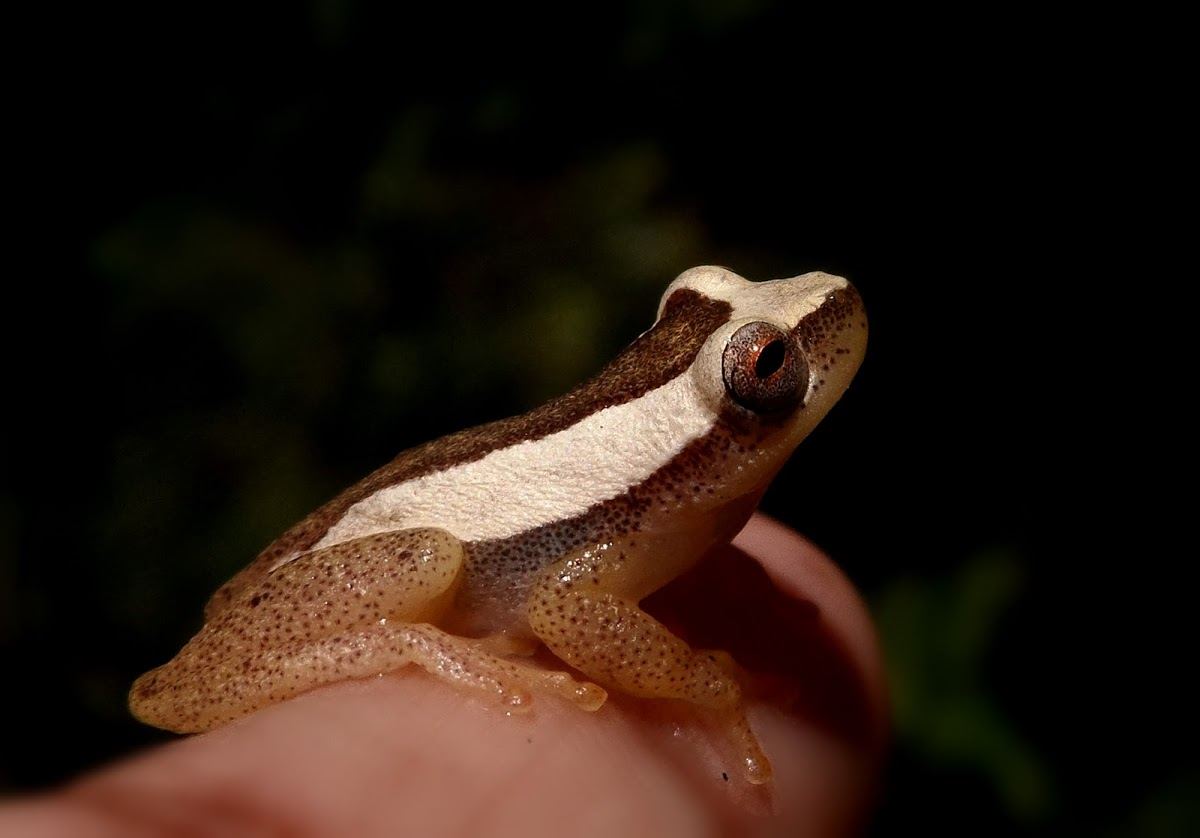

Conservation status
- Least Concern (IUCN 3.1)

Scientific classification
- Kingdom: Animalia
- Phylum: Chordata
- Class: Amphibia
- Order: Anura
- Family: Hylidae
- Genus: Dendropsophus
- Species: D. haddadi

Binomial name
- Dendropsophus haddadi (Bastos and Pombal, 1996)

Synonyms
- Hyla haddadi Bastos and Pombal, 1996

= Dendropsophus haddadi =

Species of frog

Dendropsophus haddadi is a species of frog in the family Hylidae. It is endemic to eastern Brazil, with its distribution ranging from northern Espírito Santo to Bahia, Sergipe, Alagoas, Pernambuco. The specific name haddadi honors Célio F. B. Haddad, a Brazilian ecologist and herpetologist.

== Description ==
Adult males measure 16–19 mm (0.6–0.7 in) and adult females 22–24 mm (0.9–0.9 in) in snout–vent length. The snout is short. The tympanum is distinct and relatively large. The canthus rostralis is distinct. The fingers and toes have rounded discs and are partially webbed. Dorsal coloration is variable, but most individuals are dark brown with white snout and stripes running laterally to the inguinal region.

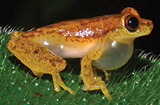
Male from Serra Bonita

== Habitat and conservation ==
Dendropsophus haddadi occurs in coastal rainforest and in scrubby coastal "restinga" vegetation, as well as in gardens, farmland, and towns, at elevations below 650 m (2,130 ft). It breeds in permanent bonds and can be spotted on vegetation around these. It is a common and very adaptable species that is not facing any threats. It is present in many protected areas.
