= Tumminakatti =

- Town
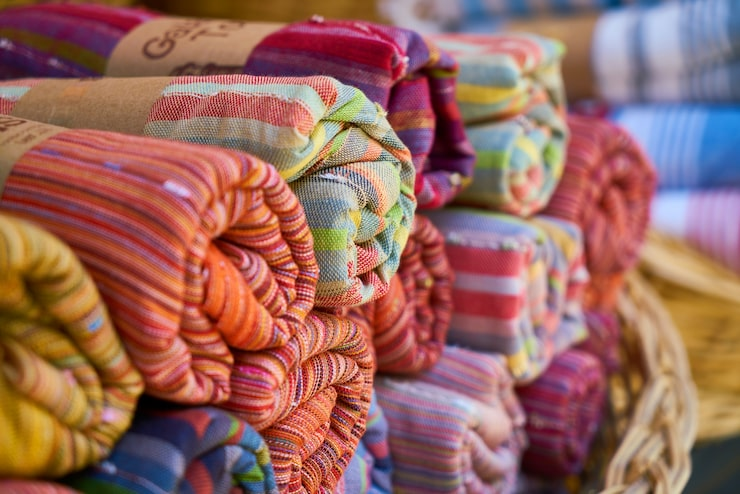
- Tumminakatti fabrics

- Location in Karnataka, India Tumminakatti (India)
- Coordinates: 14.413068°N 75.620613°E
- Country: India
- State: Karnataka
- District: Haveri

Government
  - Type: Town Panchayat

Population (2011)
  - Total: 7,499

Languages
  - Official: Kannada
- Time zone: UTC+5:30 (IST)
- Postal code: 581119
- Vehicle registration: KA-74
- Nearest city: Ranebennuru

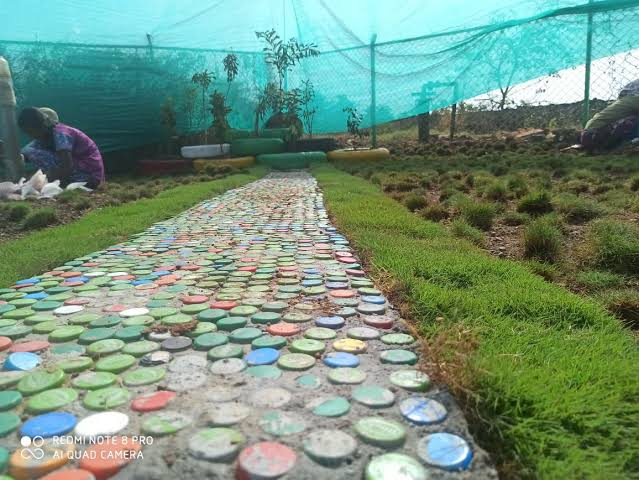
New park in Tumminakatti

Tumminakatti is a town in the southern state of Karnataka, India. It is located in the Haveri district in Karnataka.

== Location ==
Tumminakatti is situated 24km from Ranebennuru and 63km from Haveri.

== Demographics ==
As of 2011 India census, Tumminakatti had a population of 7499 with 3858 males and 3641 females. The literacy rate is 80%.

There are about 2500 houses in Tumminakatti. The local language is Kannada.

== Facilities ==
Government primary and middle, private primary and middle and government secondary schools and colleges are available in Tumminakatti.

There is one primary health care center, 2 primary health sub centres, 1 maternity and child welfare center, 1 TB clinic, 1 veterinary hospital, 2 family welfare centres, 6 clinics, and 7 medical shops.

== Economy ==
Maize and cotton are agriculture commodities grow in Tumminakatti.

"Green gram wada", made from Green gram (Hesaru Bele). and also famous for handloom clothes especially "vastra", "neeru panche" was used for god worship.

== See also ==
- List of districts of Karnataka
