= Agasanahalli (Dharwad) =

- Village
- Location in Karnataka, India Agasanahalli (India)
- Coordinates: 15°33′45″N 74°54′42″E
- Country: India
- State: Karnataka
- District: Dharwad
- Talukas: Dharwad

Government
  - Type: Panchayat raj
  - Body: Village Panchayat

Population (2011)
  - Total: 168

Languages
  - Official: Kannada
- Time zone: UTC+5:30 (IST)
- ISO 3166 code: IN-KA
- Vehicle registration: KA
- Nearest city: Dharwad
- Civic agency: Village Panchayat
- Website: karnataka.gov.in

Agasanahalli is a village in the southern state of Karnataka, India. It is located in the Dharwad taluk of Dharwad district in Karnataka.

== Demographics ==
As of the 2011 Census of India there were 37 households in Agasanahalli and a total population of 168 consisting of 84 males and 84 females. There were 29 children ages 0-6.

== See also ==
- Dharwad
- Districts of Karnataka
