= Honnāli =

Honnali
- Town
- Location in Karnataka, India
- Coordinates: 14.237275°N 75.649636°E
- Country: India
- State: Karnataka
- Region: AreMalenadu
- District: Davanagere

Government
  - Body: Town Municipal Council
  - Administrator: Abhishek V
  - Chief Officer: Niranjani H

Area
  - Town: 10.49 km^{2} (4.05 sq mi)
  - Rural: 856 km^{2} (331 sq mi)
- Elevation: 540 m (1,770 ft)

Population (2011)
  - Town: 22,138
  - Density: 2,110/km^{2} (5,466/sq mi)
  - Rural: 215,278

Languages
  - Official: Kannada
- Time zone: UTC+5:30 (IST)
- PIN: 577217
- Vehicle registration: KA-17
- Website: honnalitown.mrc.gov.in

Honnāli (also written as Honnali) is a town and a taluk headquarter in Davanagere district in the Indian state of Karnataka. Its name is derived from honnarali, which means "Blossom of gold".

== Geography ==
Honnali is located at 14.25°N 75.67°E and has an average elevation of 540 m (1771 ft). The Tungabhadra River flows through the area. It is 40 km north of Shimoga, 44 km Northwest of channagiri 46 km south of Ranebennur, 35 km southwest of Harihar and east of Shikaripur (37 km), Shirallakoppa (57 km) and Munchikoppa (61 km).

== Demographics ==
As of the 2001 census, Honnali had a population of 15,574. Males constitute 51% of the population and females 49%. Honnali has an average literacy rate of 68%, higher than the national average of 59.5%; male literacy is 73%, and female literacy is 62%. In Honnali, 12% of the population is under 6 years of age. The principal occupation is agriculture.

== Sites of interest ==
- Thirtha Rameshwara, known for a temple to Lord Shiva temple, is nearby, and Shree Madhava Ranganatha Swamy Temple is also in the vicinity, located on the banks of the River Tungabhadra in the neighbouring village of Gollarahalli.
- Sri Raghavendra Swami Mutt, also known as the Second Mantralaya, is known for its local historical importance.
- Famous Rashtra kavi J.S.Shivarudrappa studied primary school class building at main road timminkatte road owner of the building S.A.Rahaman Khan Afridi & son's old building available to view.
