= Channagiri =

- town
- Location in Karnataka, India
- Coordinates: 14.03°N 75.93°E
- Country: India
- State: Karnataka
- Region: Malenadu
- District: Davanagere

Government
  - Type: constitutional
- Elevation: 662 m (2,172 ft)

Population (2011)
  - Total: 185,170

Languages
  - Official: Kannada
- Time zone: UTC+5:30 (IST)
- PIN: 577213
- Telephone code: 08189
- ISO 3166 code: IN-KA
- Vehicle registration: KA-17
- Website: karnataka.gov.in

Channagiri is a town and Taluka in Davanagere district in the state of Karnataka, India. It is a taluk headquarters in Davanagere District from 1997. Before it was the part of Shivamogga District.

== Etymology ==
During Ganga Possession in this place called Asandinadu. Later goes under the rule of Kalyani Chalukya subsequently ruled by Pandyas of Uchchangi, later place passed into the hands of the Keladi Nayaka Kingdom in 17th century. It is said that the hill was fortified by Rani Chennamma of Keladi (1672–1697), queen of Keladi Nayaka Kingdom and town was named after her.

== Geography ==
Channagiri is located at 14.03°N 75.93°E. It has an average elevation of 662 metres (2171 feet).

== Demographics ==
As of 2001 India census, Channagiri had a population of 18,517. Males constitute 52% of the population and females 48%. Channagiri has an average literacy rate of 71%, higher than the national average of 59.5%; with male literacy of 74% and female literacy of 67%. 13% of the population is under 6 years of age.

== Hill Fort ==
Channagiri has a hill fort which was built around 1770 with a Ranganatha temple inside it, which rises to a height of about 200 feet to the west of the town consists of a single soft dark covered with earth which commands a wide plain. The fort consists of two rubble walls defending by moats, the chief gate being on the north where the gradient is lowest.

On the peak stands a temple dedicated to Sri Ranganatha. It is called Bete-Ranganatha and depicts Vishnu standing in samabhanga holding chakra and sankha in his back hands and arrow in his front hands with a low Garuda pedestal below him and a consort in relievo on the prabhavali on each side.

To its south-west is a small shrine dedicated to Bhutappa which contains the head of the god whose tongue projects out of his mouth.

== Transportation ==
NH 369 passing through Channagiri and it connects between Chitradurga and Shivamoga.

== Notable people ==
- Dhondia Wagh, early freedom fighter, was born in Channagiri
- J. H. Patel, Former Chief minister of Karnataka.
- H. S. Venkateshamurthy, poet, playwright in Kannada Language.
- M. Chidananda Murthy, Kannada writer, researcher and historian.
- Syed Naseer Hussain, Indian politician.

== See also ==
- Shanti Sagara
- Davanagere
