= Davanagere district =

District in Karnataka, India

- District of Karnataka
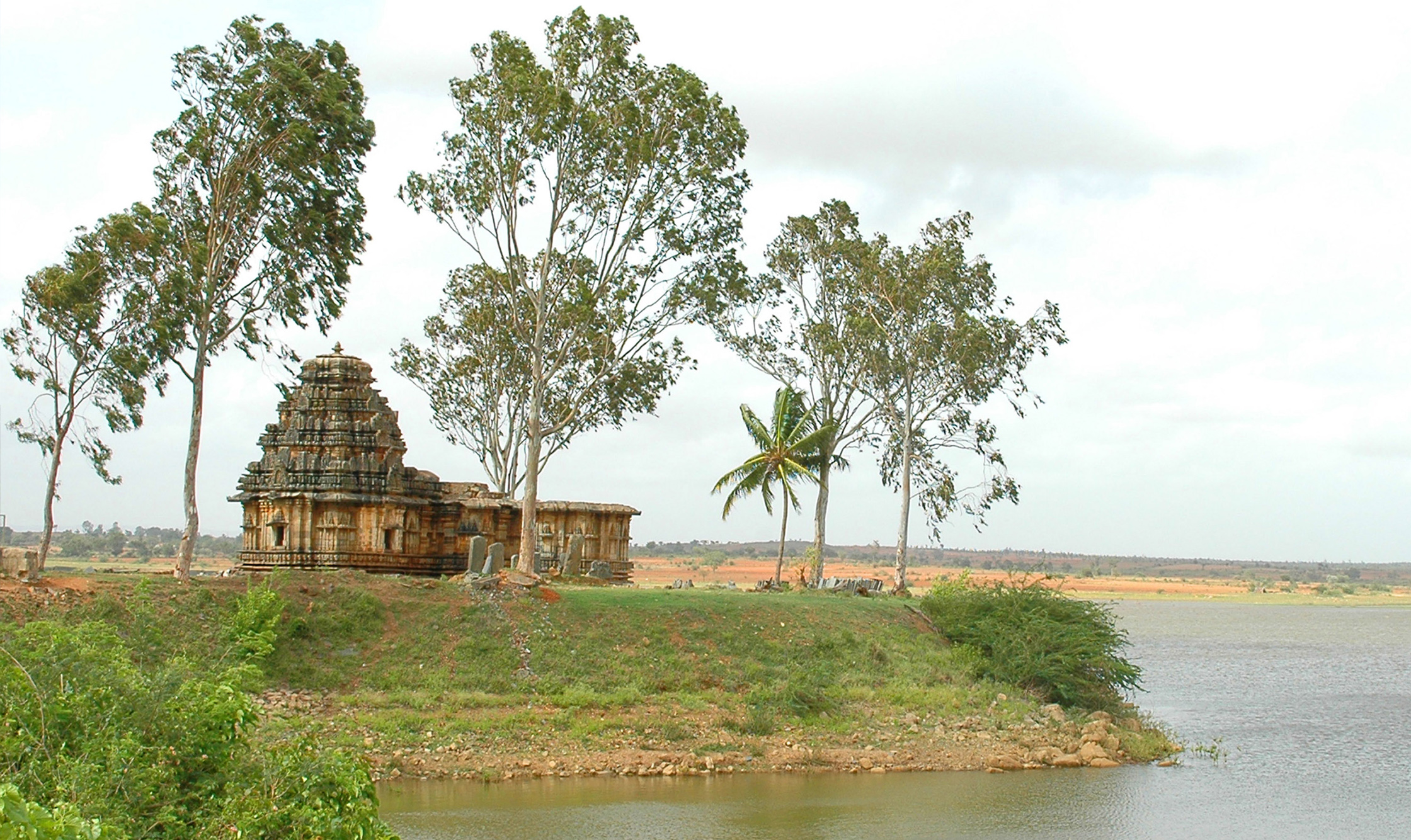
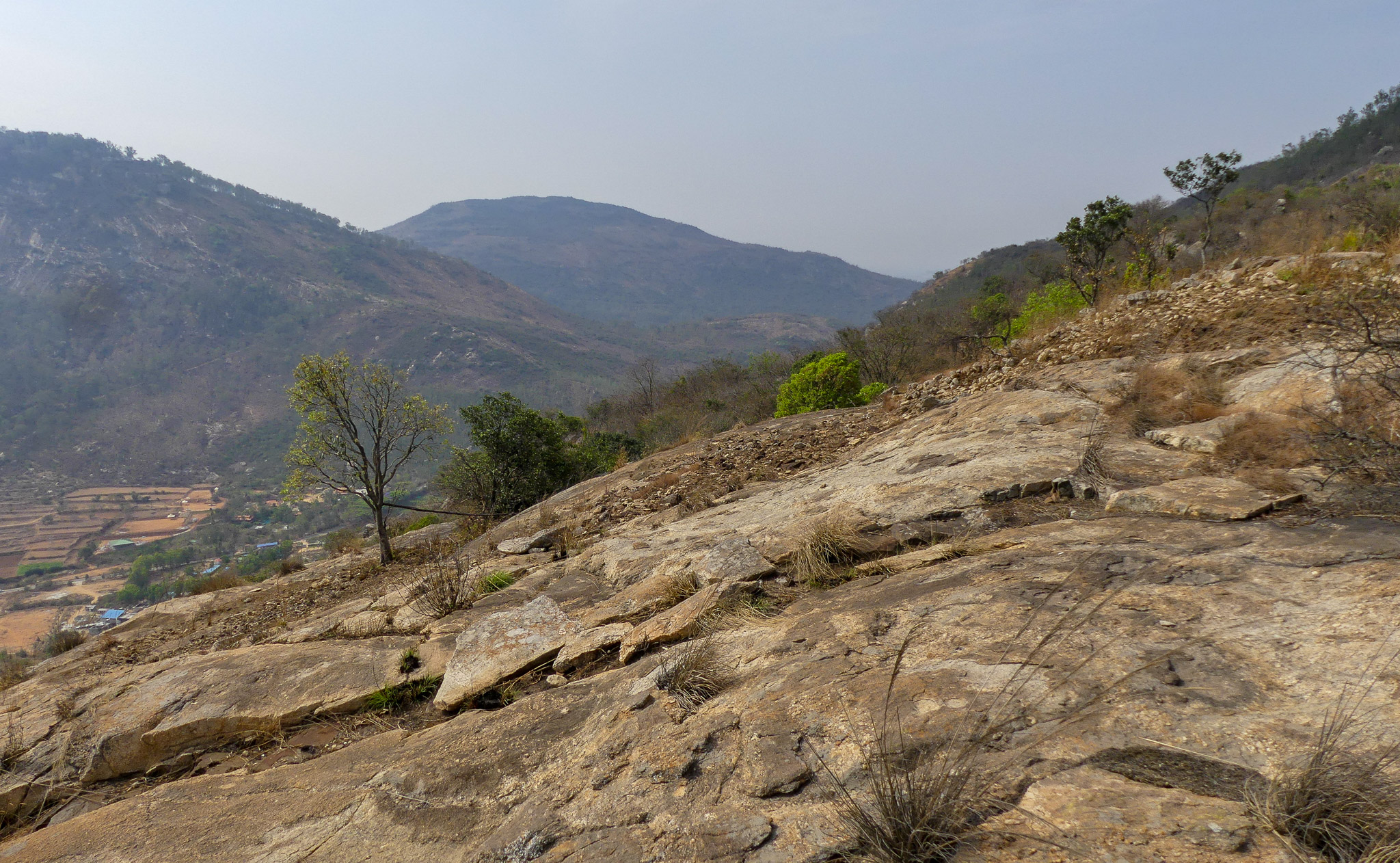
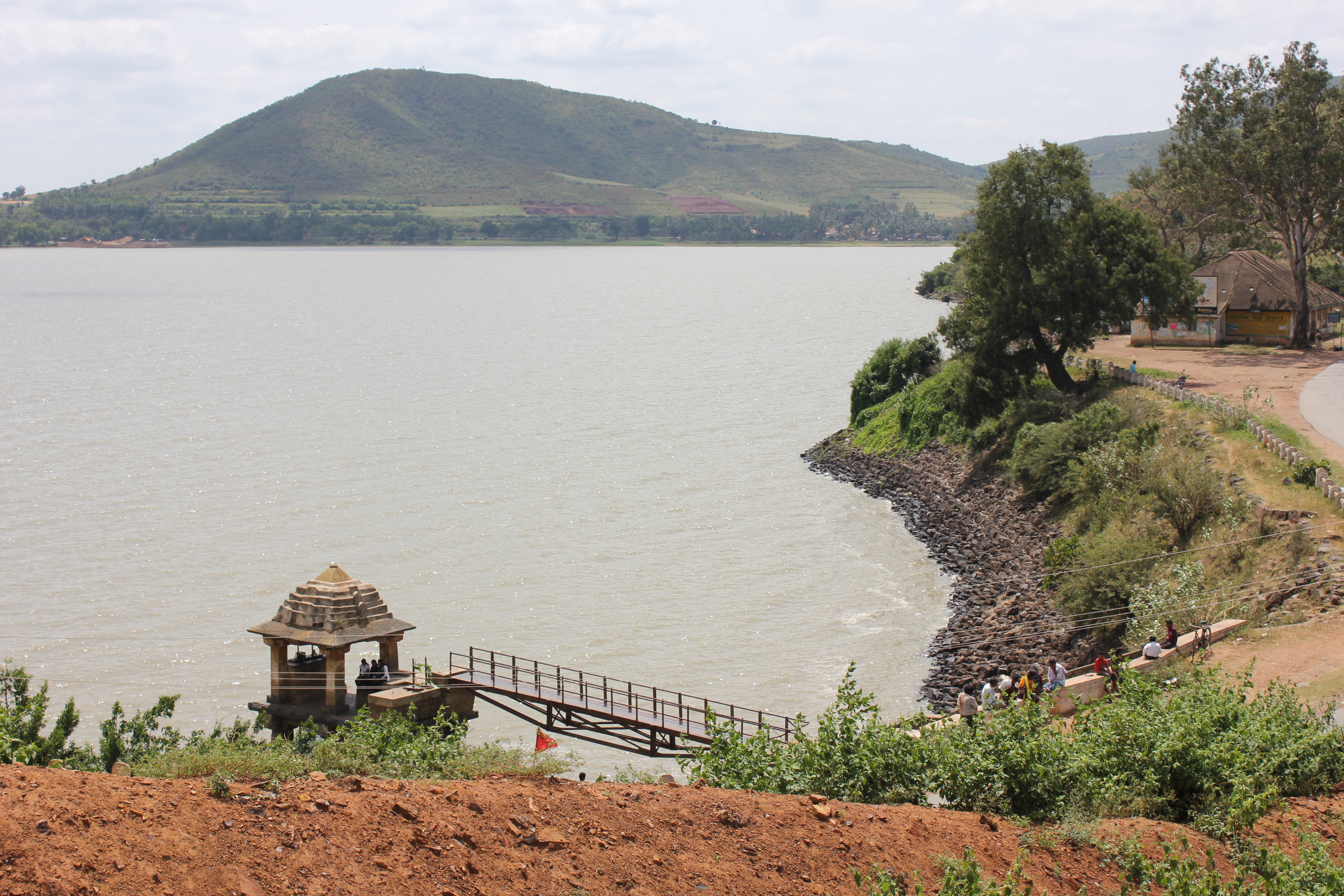
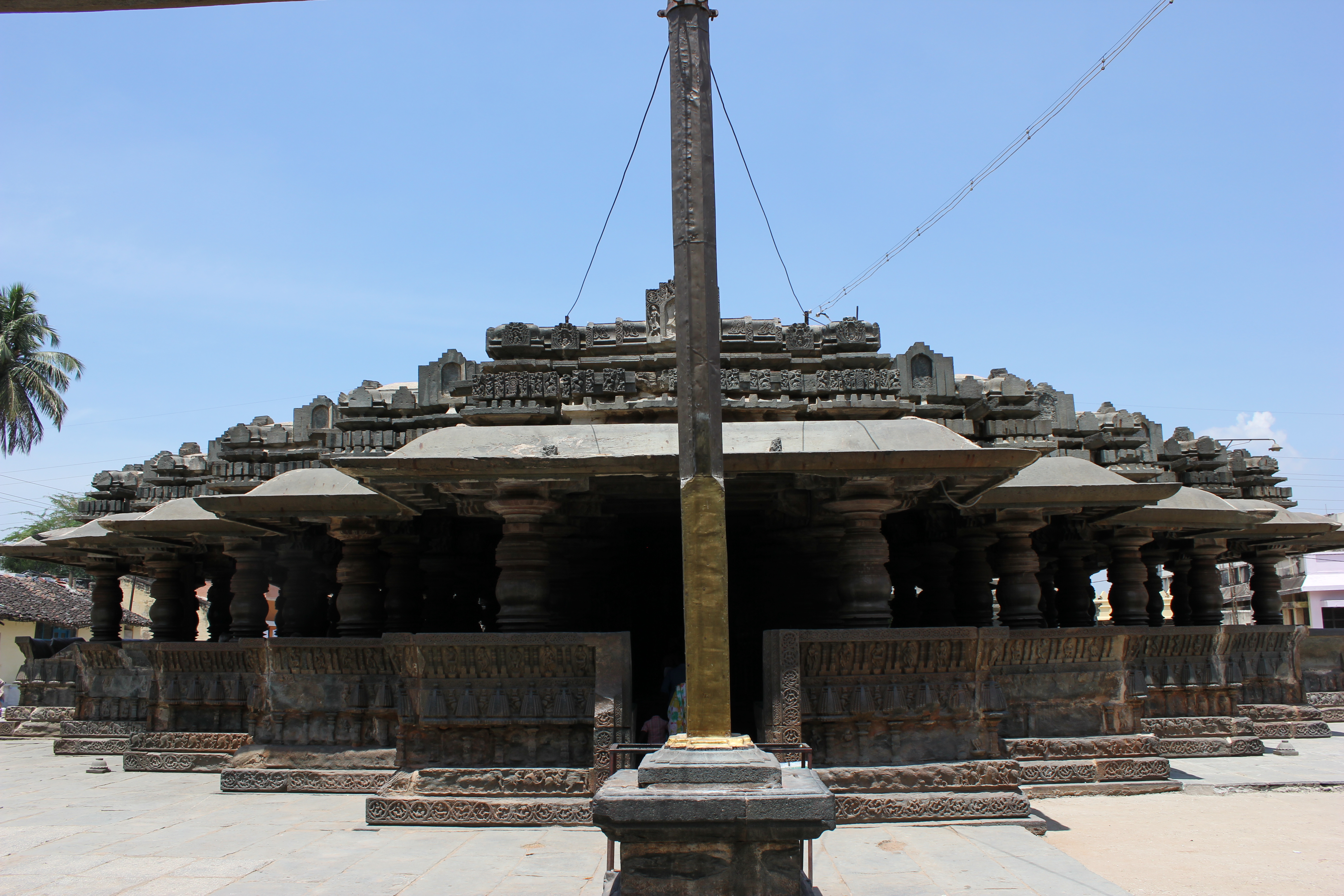
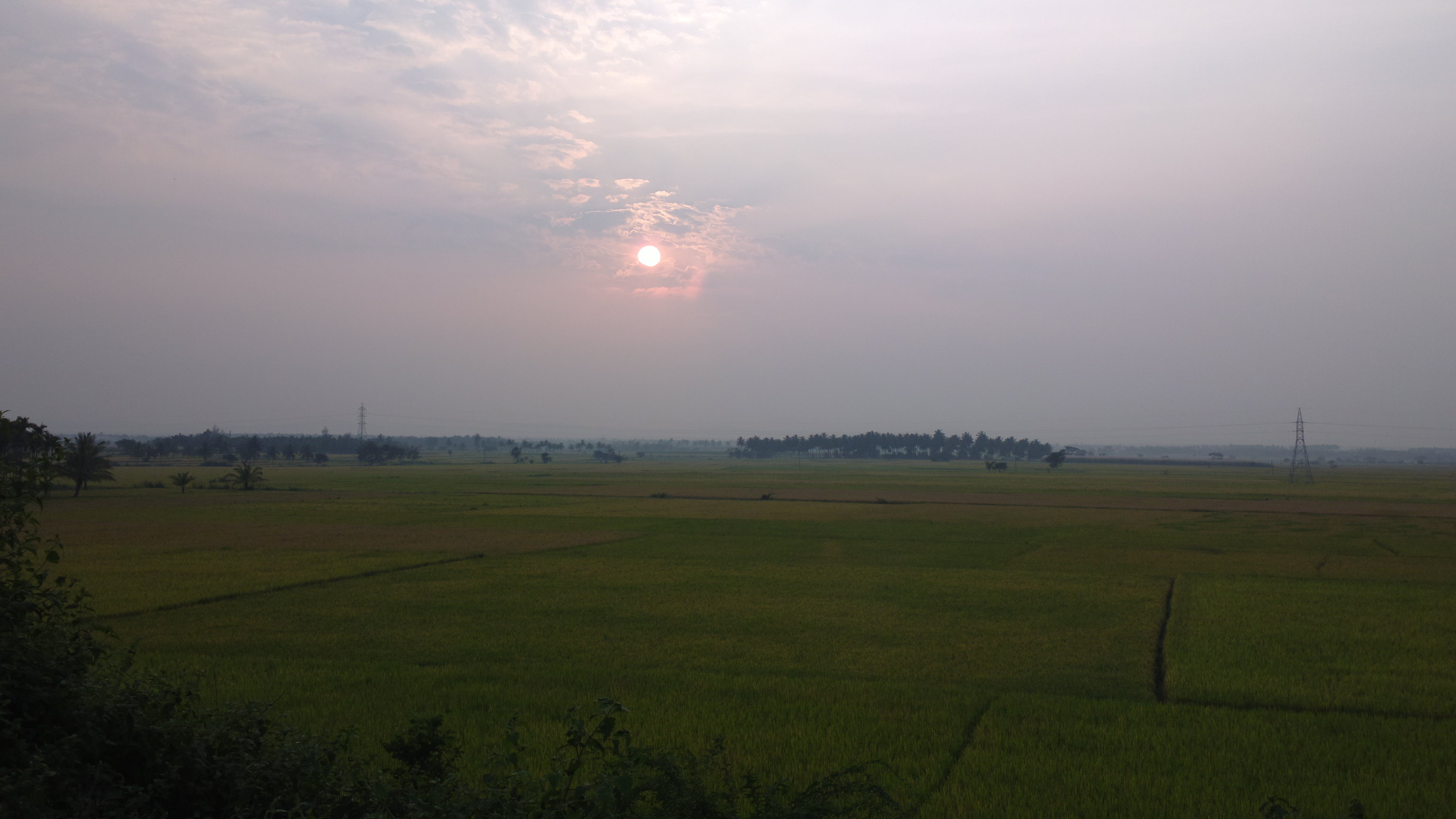
- Clockwise from top-left: Bhimeshwara Temple at Nilagunda, Hills near Channagiri, Harihareshwara Temple at Harihar, Fields near Hadadi, Shanti Sagara
- Interactive map of Davanagere district
- Coordinates: 14.23°N 75.9°E
- Country: India
- State: Karnataka
- Formed: 15 August 1997
- Headquarters: Davanagere
- Talukas: Davanagere; Harihar; Jagalur; Honnali; Channagiri; Nyamati

Government
  - Deputy Commissioner: Dr. Venkatesh M.V (IAS)
  - Superintendent of Police: Uma Prashanth I.P.S
  - District incharge Minister: S. S. Mallikarjun

Area
  - Total: 4,460 km^{2} (1,720 sq mi)

Population (2011)
  - Total: 1,643,494
  - Density: 368/km^{2} (954/sq mi)

Languages
  - Official: Kannada
- Time zone: UTC+5:30 (IST)
- PIN: 577001-006
- Telephone code: + 91 (08192
- Vehicle registration: KA-17
- Website: davanagere.nic.in

Davanagere district is an administrative district of Karnataka state in India. It is the centre of Karnataka. The city of Davanagere is the district headquarters. It had a population of 1,643,494 of which 32.31% was urban as of 2011. This district was separated from Chitradurga district in 1997 by the then Chief minister of Karnataka J. H. Patel including Channagiri and Honnali Taluks Shimoga district.

The district lies in the central plains of the state with its unique features of having an influence of the north and the south of the state. The prominent towns in this district are Harihara, Jagalur, Honnali Channagiri and Nyamati, these also happen to be its six other taluks. It is bound by Shimoga district and Haveri district on the west, Chitradurga district on the east, Vijayanagara district on the north, and Chikmagalur district on the south.

The Davanagere district has 6 taluks, 20 hoblis, 197 gram panchayats, 652 villages including Harakanahalu, 904 habitations, and 2 city municipal councils and one City Corporation.

== History ==
This area was once ruled by the Mauryas, and then later the Sathavahanas. The area was later taken over by the Kadambas, who were soon displaced by the Chalukyas of Badami. An inscription from Anaji dating to the 9th century CE indicates a branch of the Pallavas called the Nolambas ruled part of the district. Part of the district was briefly conquered by a branch of the Gangas in Asandi. By the middle of the 8th century, the Rashtrakutas from Malkhed had established supremacy over the Chalukyas, and conquered territory south to Tumkur.

An inscription in the Bagali temple indicates part of Davanagere district was ruled by a Chalukya feudatory of the Rashtrakutas in the 10th century. Other parts continued to be ruled by the Nolambas as feudatories of the Rashtrakutas. When Rashtrakuta power began collapsing, the Nolambas switched their loyalty to the Gangas and fought against the Chola invasions. When the Chalukyas of Kalyani gained in power, the Nolambas became loyal to them. When the Cholas sacked Kampli, they appointed some of their Pandya vassals as governors of Nolambavadi corresponding to part of Davanagere. The Kalachuris, who were also feudatories of the Chalukyas, were soon given charge of the entire south of Chalukya domains. Their ruler Bijjala II overthrew the Chalukyas and his dynasty ruled until 1181, when the Chalukya prince Someshwara IV took back the throne.

Briefly the Hoysalas ruled parts of Davanagere district in the late 12th century before the region was taken by the Yadavas of Devagiri. The Yadava and Hoysala rule in the region was overthrown by the invasions of Malik Kafur of the Delhi Sultanate in the 14th century, but soon the district came under the control of the Vijayanagara Empire direct from Vijayanagara.

After the Vijayanagara Empire was severely weakened in 1565 after the Battle of Talikota, the local nayakas in Davanagere started asserting their independence. Some of these chiefs were allowed to rule as feudatories of the Adlil Shahis of Bijapur. Both the Mughals and Marathas briefly captured forts in the district. In 1763, one of these families, the Nayaks of Belagutti, submitted to Hyder Ali and the district was under the rule of Mysore. Dhondia Wagh of Channagiri who had created an independent principality resisted the Britishers after Tipu Sultan's defeat until his death in 1800. The district then was kept by Mysore state.

== Geography ==
Some parts of Davanagere district lies in the plain region on the Deccan Plateau locally known as Bayaluseeme and western parts of the district lies in Malnad region locally known as Malenadu. The district is bounded by Haveri district in the northwest, Shimoga district in the southwest, Chikmagalur district in the south, Chitradurga district in the southeast and Vijayanagara district in the north. The district lies in the center of Karnataka between the latitudes 13°5' and 14°50' N and between the longitudes 75°30' and 76°30' E. There are many windy places within the district favouring the recent growth of wind energy industry across the district. The district has an area of 5,926 km^{2} (2,288 sq mi).

== Economy ==
In 2006 the Ministry of Panchayati Raj named Davanagere one of the country's 250 most backward districts (out of a total of 640). It is one of the five districts in Karnataka currently receiving funds from the Backward Regions Grant Fund Programme (BRGF).

== Demographics ==
Historical population
Year	Pop.	±% p.a.
1901	401,990	—
1911	418,715	+0.41%
1921	390,009	−0.71%
1931	451,392	+1.47%
1941	497,221	+0.97%
1951	584,822	+1.64%
1961	735,937	+2.32%
1971	956,654	+2.66%
1981	1,266,945	+2.85%
1991	1,559,222	+2.10%
2001	1,790,952	+1.40%
2011	1,945,497	+0.83%

Religion in Davanagere district (2011)
Religion	Percent
Hinduism	84.38%
Islam	14.47%
Other or not stated	1.15%

According to the 2011 census Davanagere district has a population of 1,945,497 roughly equal to the nation of Lesotho or the US state of West Virginia. This gives it a ranking of 241 amongst a total of 640 districts in India. The district has a population density of 329 inhabitants per square kilometre (850/sq mi). Its population growth rate over the decade 2001–2011 was 8.71%. Davanagere has a sex ratio of 967 females for every 1000 males, and a literacy rate of 76.3%. After transfer of Harapanahalli taluk the district had a population of 1,643,494, of which 581,971 (35.41%) live in urban areas. The residual district has a sex ratio of 975 females per 1000 males. Scheduled Castes and Scheduled Tribes make up 318,305 (19.37%) and 182,804 (11.12%) of the population respectively.

Languages in Davanagere district (2011)
1. Kannada (77.3%)
2. Urdu (13.9%)
3. Telugu (3.03%)
4. Lambadi (3.01%)
5. Marathi (1.04%)
6. Others (1.78%)

At the time of the 2011 census, 77.27% of the population spoke Kannada, 13.87% Urdu, 3.03% Telugu, 3.01% Lambadi and 1.04% Marathi as their first language.
