= Davanagere =

- City
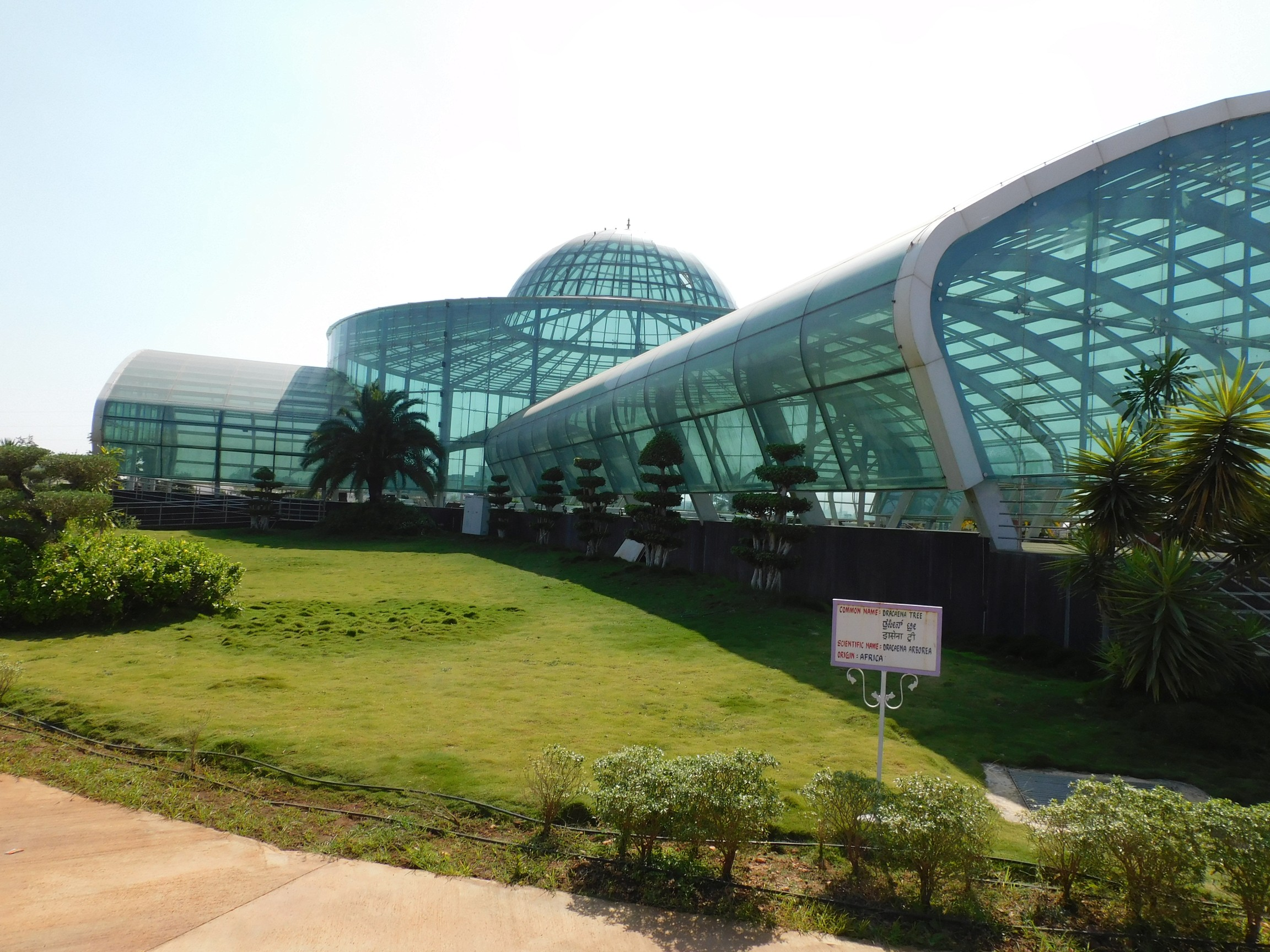
- 'Davanagere glass House'
- Nickname: Bennenagari
- Interactive map of Davanagere
- Coordinates: 14.4666°N 75.9242°E
- Country: India
- State: Karnataka
- District: Davanagere

Government
  - Type: Municipal Corporation
  - Body: Davanagere City Corporation
  - Mayor: K. Chaman Sab
  - MLA: S. S. Mallikarjun (Davanagere North); Samarth Mallikarjun Shamanur (Davanagere South)
  - MP: Prabha Mallikarjun

Area
  - Total: 68.63 km^{2} (26.50 sq mi)
  - Rank: 9th

Population (2011-12)
  - Total: 435,125
  - Rank: 9th(Karnataka)
  - Density: 6,340/km^{2} (16,420/sq mi)
- Demonym: Davanagerians
- Time zone: UTC+5:30 (IST)
- PIN: 577001-577008
- Telephone code: 08192
- Vehicle registration: KA-17
- Official language: Kannada
- Website: davanagerecity.mrc.gov.in

Dāvanagere is a city, taluka in the centre of the southern Indian state of Karnataka. It is the seventh largest city in the state and the administrative headquarters of the eponymous Davangere district. Hitherto being a cotton hub and hence popularly known before as the Manchester of Karnataka. Historically, the city's textile trade was supported by regional weaving centers. the City's commercial ventures are now dominated by the education and agro-processing industries. Davanagere became a separate district in 1997, when it was separated from the erstwhile undivided district of Chitradurga for administrative convenience. Davanagere is known for its rich culinary traditions which encompass the diversity of entire Karnataka's dishes due to its geographical position in the state as its centre. Notable among them is its aromatic benne dose.

Davanagere was selected as one of the hundred Indian cities to be developed as a smart city under the Central government's Smart Cities Mission. It was among the first 20 towns developed under the Ministry of Urban Development's mission. According to the 2020 human living index, it was ranked the 9th most livable city in India with a population under 10 million.

== Civic administration ==
Davangere has been at the forefront of municipal administration, attaining municipal status as early as 1870. The Imperial Gazetteer of India (1911) states that the municipality's receipts and expenditure, during the ten years ending 1901, averaged Rs 14,200 and Rs 12,600, respectively. The city's civic administration was managed by the Nagarasabhe before it was established as a municipality on 7 August 1951. It now has the status of a City Corporation, which was upgraded on 6 January 2007. It is headed by a Mayor, assisted by Commissioners and council members. The city is divided into 45 wards, and council members (corporators) are elected by the city's residents.

== Geography ==
Davanagere is the "Heart of Karnataka". Davanagere is surrounded by the Chitradurga, Vijayanagara, Shimoga, Chikmagalur and Haveri districts. Davanagere is at the centre of Karnataka, 14°28' N latitude, 75°59' longitude and 602.5 metres (1,977 ft) above sea level. Davanagere District receives an average annual rainfall of 644 mm (25.4 in).

== Demographics ==
Historical population
Year	Pop.	±%
1931	23,155	—
1941	31,759	+37.2%
1951	56,018	+76.4%
1961	78,124	+39.5%
1971	121,110	+55.0%
1981	196,621	+62.3%
1991	287,233	+46.1%
2001	364,523	+26.9%
2011	435,125	+19.4%

Religions in Davanagere City (2011)
Religion	Percent
Hinduism	73.14%
Islam	24.57%
Jainism	1.04%
Christianity	0.65%
Other or not stated	0.60%

The current estimated population of Davanagere city in 2025 is 633,000 https://census2011.co.in/census/city/442-davanagere.html, while the Davanagere metro population is estimated at 0. The last census was conducted in 2011, and the scheduled census for Davanagere city in 2021 was postponed due to Covid. The current estimates for Davanagere city are based on past growth rates. Once the government conducts a census for Davanagere city, we will update it in 2025. As per the provisional reports of the Census of India, the population of Davanagere in 2011 was 434,971.

Languages of Davanagere (2011)
1. Kannada (66.4%)
2. Urdu (23.8%)
3. Telugu (2.81%)
4. Marathi (1.96%)
5. Tamil (1.17%)
6. Konkani (1.04%)
7. Others (2.83%)

=== Davanagere Literacy Rate and Sex Ratio ===
In the education section, the total literates in Davanagere city are 329,003 of which 174,019 are males while 154,984 are females. The average literacy rate of Davanagere city is 84.90 per cent, of which male and female literacy was 89.02 and 80.71 per cent. The sex ratio of Davanagere city is 979 per 1000 males. Child sex ratio of girls is 954 per 1000 boys.

== Climate ==
Davanagere has been ranked 25th among the “National Clean Air City” under (Category 2 3-10L Population cities) in India.

Climate data for Davanagere (1991–2020)
Month	Jan	Feb	Mar	Apr	May	Jun	Jul	Aug	Sep	Oct	Nov	Dec	Year
Record high °C (°F)	37.0 (98.6)	37.0 (98.6)	39.0 (102.2)	40.5 (104.9)	40.0 (104.0)	38.5 (101.3)	34.0 (93.2)	33.0 (91.4)	34.0 (93.2)	35.0 (95.0)	33.5 (92.3)	34.0 (93.2)	40.5 (104.9)
Mean daily maximum °C (°F)	30.8 (87.4)	32.8 (91.0)	35.3 (95.5)	36.5 (97.7)	35.3 (95.5)	30.8 (87.4)	28.5 (83.3)	28.0 (82.4)	28.8 (83.8)	30.1 (86.2)	29.8 (85.6)	29.9 (85.8)	31.4 (88.5)
Mean daily minimum °C (°F)	13.3 (55.9)	15.5 (59.9)	18.2 (64.8)	20.8 (69.4)	21.3 (70.3)	21.0 (69.8)	20.6 (69.1)	20.7 (69.3)	20.5 (68.9)	19.1 (66.4)	16.5 (61.7)	15.4 (59.7)	18.5 (65.3)
Record low °C (°F)	5.6 (42.1)	5.6 (42.1)	10.8 (51.4)	13.6 (56.5)	13.8 (56.8)	12.6 (54.7)	13.6 (56.5)	15.5 (59.9)	11.6 (52.9)	12.3 (54.1)	8.6 (47.5)	7.8 (46.0)	5.6 (42.1)
Average rainfall mm (inches)	1.2 (0.05)	0.0 (0.0)	13.6 (0.54)	50.5 (1.99)	87.6 (3.45)	77.2 (3.04)	101.4 (3.99)	121.5 (4.78)	132.3 (5.21)	123.4 (4.86)	45.5 (1.79)	4.5 (0.18)	753.7 (29.67)
Average rainy days	0.1	0.0	0.6	2.7	5.2	6.3	10.5	10.8	8.8	5.9	1.5	0.4	52.6
Average relative humidity (%) (at 17:30 IST)	49	40	30	32	39	65	76	76	71	64	66	65	56
Source: India Meteorological Department

== See also ==
- Benne dose
- Shamanur
- Kundavada Kere
