= Belagere =

- Village
- Location in Karnataka, India Belagere (India)
- Coordinates: 14.160793°N 76.753020°E
- Country: India
- State: Karnataka
- District: Chitradurga

Government
  - Body: Gram Panchayat
- Elevation: 600 m (2,000 ft)

Population (2011)
  - Total: 2,769

Languages
  - Official: Kannada
- Time zone: UTC+5:30 (IST)
- PIN Code: 577522
- STD code: 08195
- Vehicle registration: KA 16

Belagere is a village in Challakere, Chitradurga district, Karnataka, India. It is located on the left bank of Vedavati River. According to the 2011 census of India, there was a population of 2769 people (1459 males; 1310 females).

== Demographic ==
In Belagere village, the population of children ages 0-6 is 251 which makes up 9.06% of the total population of the village. The average sex ratio of Belagere village is 898 which is lower than Karnataka state average of 973. The child sex ratio for Belagere as per census is 806, lower than Karnataka average of 948.

Belagere village has lower literacy rate compared to Karnataka. In 2011, literacy rate of Belagere village was 72.95% compared to 75.36% of Karnataka. In Belagere Male literacy stands at 83.18% while female literacy rate was 61.69%.

As per constitution of India and Panchyati Raaj Act, Belagere village is administrated by Sarpanch (Head of Village) who is elected representative of village.

== Geography ==
Belagere is located at 14.160793°N 76.753020°E at an altitude of 600m approx.

== Transportation ==
Belagere is connected by MDR roads. It is 14 km away from NH 150A, which connects Chamrajnagar and Jewargi. Belagere is well connected to Challakere which is 28 km and Hiriyur which is 40 km by road.

Challakere and Chitradurga are the nearest railway stations.
