= Abbaiahnahalli =

- village
- Location in Karnataka, India Abbaiahnahalli (India)
- Coordinates: 14.5791400°N 76.567010°E
- Country: India
- State: Karnataka
- District: Chitradurga
- Talukas: Challakere

Government
  - Body: Village Panchayat

Languages
  - Official: Kannada
- Time zone: UTC+5:30 (IST)
- Nearest city: Chitradurga
- Civic agency: Village Panchayat

Abbaiahnahalli is a village in the southern state of Karnataka, India. It is located in the Challakere taluk of Chitradurga district in Karnataka.

== See also ==
- Chitradurga
- Districts of Karnataka
