= Ghataparthi =

- village
- Location in Karnataka, India Ghataparthi (India)
- Coordinates: 14.32°N 76.64°E
- Country: India
- State: Karnataka
- District: Chitradurga
- Talukas: Challakere

Population (2001)
  - Total: 5,408

Languages
  - Official: Kannada
- Time zone: UTC+5:30 (IST)

Ghataparthi is a village in the southern state of Karnataka, India. It is located in the Challakere taluk of Chitradurga district in Karnataka.

== Demographics ==
As of 2001 India census, Ghataparthi had a population of 5408 with 2758 males and 2650 females.

== See also ==
- Chitradurga
- Districts of Karnataka
