= Nannivala =

- village
- Location in Karnataka, India Nannivala (India)
- Coordinates: 14.32°N 76.64°E
- Country: India
- State: Karnataka
- District: Chitradurga
- Talukas: Challakere

Population (2001)
  - Total: 6,380

Languages
  - Official: Kannada
- Time zone: UTC+5:30 (IST)

Nannivala is a village in the southern state of Karnataka, India. It is located in the Challakere taluk of Chitradurga district in Karnataka.

== Demographics ==
As of the 2001 India census, Nannivala had a population of 6,380 with 3,341 males and 3,039 females.

== See also ==
- Chitradurga
- Districts of Karnataka
