= Adiralu =

Coordinates: 14°03′N 76°31′E

- village
- Adiralu is in Chitradurga district
- Interactive map of Adiralu
- Country: India
- State: Karnataka
- District: Chitradurga
- Talukas: Hiriyur

Government
  - Body: Village Panchayat

Population (2011)
  - Total: 1,350

Languages
  - Official: Kannada
- Time zone: UTC+5:30 (IST)
- Nearest city: Chitradurga
- Civic agency: Village Panchayat

Adiralu is a village in the southern state of Karnataka, India. It is located in the Hiriyur taluk of Chitradurga district in Karnataka.

== See also ==
- Chitradurga
- Districts of Karnataka
