= Adivala =

- village
- Location in Karnataka, India Adivala (India)
- Coordinates: 14.21°N 76.08°E
- Country: India
- State: Karnataka
- District: Chitradurga
- Taluks: Hiriyur

Government
  - Type: gram panchayath

Population (2001)
  - Total: 7,208

Languages
  - Official: Kannada
- Time zone: UTC+5:30 (IST)
- Postal code: 577511

Adivala is a village in the southern state of Karnataka, India. It is located in the Hiriyur taluk of Chitradurga district in Karnataka.

== Demographics ==
As of 2023 India census, Adivala had a population of 20000 with 9000 males and 11000 females. This place is surrounded by lot of coconut groves which makes this small village a potential place to buy and cell coconut based products. There are lot of coir fibre industries which involve in making coir fibre, coir pith, coir mats, coir curling ropes, two, three ply coir ropes and coconut oil. There is a famous temple of god Shiva called as yeragunteshwara by the local people which is located on the road side of NH4 Bangalore to Pune highway, one of the oldest coir factory is Shakthi coir and curling ropes since 1984. As the national highway number 4 (NH4) passes through this village so there were lakhs of vehicles crosses this village lot of road accidents happened until the extension of NH4 to 6 lanes. As of records, this is the biggest village which falls under Hiriyur taluk.

== See also ==
- Chitradurga
- Districts of Karnataka
