= Kanajanahalli =

- village
- Location in Karnataka, India Kanajanahalli (India)
- Coordinates: 14.21°N 76.08°E
- Country: India
- State: Karnataka
- District: Chitradurga
- Talukas: Hiriyur

Languages
  - Official: Kannada
- Time zone: UTC+5:30 (IST)
- Postal code: 577546

Kanajanahalli is a village in the southern state of Karnataka, India. It is located in the Hiriyur taluk of Chitradurga district in Karnataka.

== Demographics ==
As of 2001 India census, Kanajanahalli had a population of 7040 with 3554 males and 3486 females.

== See also ==
- Chitradurga
- Districts of Karnataka
