= Abbinahole =

- village
- Location in Karnataka, India Abbinahole (India)
- Coordinates: 14.046050°N 76.753180°E
- Country: India
- State: Karnataka
- District: Chitradurga
- Talukas: Hiriyur

Government
  - Body: Village Panchayat

Languages
  - Official: Kannada
- Time zone: UTC+5:30 (IST)
- Nearest city: Chitradurga
- Civic agency: Village Panchayat

Abbinahole is a village in the southern state of Karnataka, India. It is located in the Hiriyur taluk of Chitradurga district in Karnataka.

== See also ==
- Chitradurga
- Districts of Karnataka
