= Doddachellur =

- village
- Location in Karnataka, India Doddachellur (India)
- Coordinates: 14.1869400°N 76.8771800°E
- Country: India
- State: Karnataka
- District: Chitradurga district
- Talukas: Challakere

Government
  - Body: Gram panchayat

Languages
  - Official: Kannada
- Time zone: UTC+5:30 (IST)
- ISO 3166 code: IN-KA
- Vehicle registration: KA
- Website: karnataka.gov.in

Doddachellur is a village in the Challakere taluk of Karnataka state, India. The population is around 1500 according to the 2011 Census of India.
