= Aimangala, Hiriyur =

Aimangala
- village
- Aimangala, Hiriyur is in Chitradurga district
- Country: India
- State: Karnataka
- District: Chitradurga
- Talukas: Hiriyur

Government
  - Body: Village Panchayat

Languages
  - Official: Kannada
- Time zone: UTC+5:30 (IST)
- Nearest city: Chitradurga
- Civic agency: Village Panchayat

Aimangala, Hiriyur is a village in the southern state of Karnataka, India. It is located in the Hiriyur taluk of Chitradurga district in Karnataka.

== See also ==
- Chitradurga
- Districts of Karnataka
