= Bharamasagara =

- Hobli
- Location in Karnataka, India Bharamasagara (India)
- Coordinates: 14.22°N 76.40°E
- Country: India
- State: Karnataka
- District: Chitradurga
- Talukas: Chitradurga

Population (2001)
  - Total: 6,244

Languages
  - Official: Kannada
- Time zone: UTC+5:30 (IST)

Bharamasagara is a village in the southern state of Karnataka, India. It is located in the Chitradurga taluk of Chitradurga district in Karnataka.

== Demographics and History ==
As of the 2001 India census, Bharamasagara had a population of 6244 with 3196 males and 3048 females. Bharamasagara achieved the status of a taluk due to its burgeoning population and expanding trade. Infrastructural developments in the city include a new bus stand. It is situated in between the towns of Chitradurga and Davangere, and is famous for its duck sanctuary. Palegaar (ruler of Chitradurga) Bharamanna nayaka had built two reservoirs (Doddakere and Chikkakere) here in seventeenth century. So this village has got its name as Bharamasagara. A historical temple of deity Durgambika stands here. Every year a grand fair of Deity Durgambika is celebrated. Recently the reservoir(Doddakere) has named after the Palegar king Bharamanna Nayaka. the reservoir tanks up from the river Tungabharda from the Rajanahalli Lift irrigation project which filled the reservoir and further water from reservoir is pumped to 42 near by village lakes. The city is also well known for its delicious Jackfruits and Hyacinth Bean which are exported all over the state.

== See also ==
- Chitradurga
- Districts of KarnatakaE
