= Chikkalagatta =

Village in Chitradurga district, Karnataka, India

Chikkalagatta is a small village of Chitradurga district. It is located about 224 km from the state capital Bengaluru and 24 from Chitradurga.
