= Doddasiddavvanahalli =

- village
- Location in Karnataka, India Doddasiddavvanahalli (India)
- Coordinates: 14.22°N 76.40°E
- Country: India
- State: Karnataka
- District: Chitradurga
- Talukas: Chitradurga

Population (2001)
  - Total: 6,766

Languages
  - Official: Kannada
- Time zone: UTC+5:30 (IST)

Doddasiddavvanahalli is a village in the southern state of Karnataka, India. It is located in the Chitradurga taluk of Chitradurga district in Karnataka. It is besides NH4, 6 miles from before Chitradurga city.

== Demographics ==
As of 2001 India census, Doddasiddavvanahalli had a population of 6766 with 3423 males and 3343 females.

The famous Ex. Chief Minister S.Nijalingappa is also from this village.

== Famous people ==
- S.Nijalingappa (Siddavvanahalli Nijalingappa )(Vinayak) - politician, ex-CM, ex-MP and ex AICC President

== See also ==
- Chitradurga
- Districts of Karnataka
