= Dyamavvanahalli =

- village
- Location in Karnataka, India Dyamavvanahalli (India)
- Coordinates: 14.22°N 76.40°E
- Country: India
- State: Karnataka
- District: Chitradurga
- Talukas: Chitradurga

Population (2001)
  - Total: 6,495

Languages
  - Official: Kannada
- Time zone: UTC+5:30 (IST)

Dyamavvanahalli is a village in the southern state of Karnataka, India. It is located in the Chitradurga taluk of Chitradurga district in Karnataka.

== Demographics ==
As of 2001 India census, Dyamavvanahalli had a population of 6495 with 3304 males and 3191 females.

== See also ==
- Chitradurga
- Districts of Karnataka
