= K. Ballekatte =

K. Ballekatte is a village in the Chitradurga district of the Indian state of Karnataka. It is one of 197 villages in the Chitradurga Block, along with villages like Iyyanahalli and Lakshmisagara. The population of K. Ballekatte is 1062.
