= Koodlahalli =

Koodlahalli is a village in Hiriyur Taluk of Chitradurga District, Karnataka, India. The Suvarnamukhi and Vedavathi rivers meet at the periphery of this village, which is also where the Sangameshwara temple is located. The Pathappa temple is in the centre of the village. The population of Koodlahalli is around 2000.
