= P. R. Thippeswamy =

- Born: Patel Rudrappa Thippeswamy; 11 August 1922; Harthikote, Hiriyur Taluk, Chitradurga District, Karnataka, British Raj
- Died: 7 April 2000 (aged 77); Mysore, Karnataka, India
- Other name: PRT
- Education: Chamarajendra Academy of Visual Arts (CAVA), Mysore
- Occupations: artist, folklorist, writer
- Parent(s): Patel Rudrappa, Lakshmamma

P.R. Thippeswamy (11 August 1922 – 7 April 2000) was an artist and folklorist of Karnataka. He was popularly known as PRT. He was instrumental in establishment of the "Folklore Museum" in Mysore in 1968. He was also the first curator of the museum. The folklore museum contains Representative collection of arts and crafts from all over Karnataka. P.R.Thippeswamy brought material from all over Karnataka to increase the collection. One of the displays in the museum is the "Ink" prepared locally by the great grandfather of the late P.R.Thippeswamy at Dodderi village of Chitradurga District 200 years ago.

== Family ==
He was born on 11 August 1922. He hailed from Harthikote village of Hiriyur taluk in Chitradurga district. His father was Patel Rudrappa and mother Lakshmamma and grand father is Patel Thippaiah. His father and grand father serves as Patel (Village Headman) of the village "Harthikote" and got popularity in the surrounding villages for their justice and moral. They also served as the members of District board.

Actually Thippeswamy was supposed to become the Patel as he was being the first son of the family. Since he got diverted towards Arts and left the village for his higher studies, his younger brother Shivarudrappa become the Patel of the village.

Thippeswamy died on 7 April 2000, in Mysore.

== Artist ==
He was an artist, he carved a niche for himself with his mastery of watercolours. Great poet, Raashtra Kavi Kuvempu got inspired by his paintings which captures the nature beauty of his native village Kuppalli and wrote a poem by inspiring those paintings. Those 6–7 paintings are still available in Kuvempu's house "Udaya Ravi" in Mysore.

Being an artist, Mr Thippeswamy had a clear vision about how and where to search for the most important and significant representations of the world of folk art to be displayed in the museum. He travelled throughout Karnataka to collect them for the museum. He was instrumental in establishment of the "Folklore Museum" in Mysore in 1968. He was also responsible for setting up "Manjusha Museum" in Dharmasthala. His watercolours of 'Gagan Mahal' and 'Krishna Deva Raya's are displayed prominently in the museum in Dharmasthala.

== Awards ==
Thippeswamy was also a poet and Indologist. He was also served as chairman of "Karnataka Lalitha Kala Academy" and won the Kannada Rajyotsava and K.Venkatappa award in 1999 and many more.

A commemorative volume on his life and achievements called "Harathi Jyothji" which was edited by Prof. Pramesha was released in 2007 by former education minister of Karnataka Mr H.Vishwanath.

P R Thippeswamy Foundation trust has been formed in the year 2013 by his relatives, friends and fans. The trust organizes "PRT Kalasambhrama" a 3 days function on 12, 13 and 14 August 2014 in association with Kannada and Culture Department and Karnataka Lalithakala and Janapada Academy and Sri Kalaniketana School of Arts in Mysore.

CM Siddaramaiah presented an award which is named after PRT (P R Thippeswamy Kala Prashasthi) to Senior artist A.S. Patil from Gulbarga at the valedictory of the "PRT Kalasambhrama".

In the same event a souvenir called "Kayaka Yogi" edited by writer Manasa was released by Mysore University Vice Chancellor Prof. K.S. Rangappa and a documentary film directed by Artist David released by Co-operation Minister H.S. Mahadeva Prasad. pwd minister Dr. H.C. Mahadevappa preside over the function. Revenue minister V. Srinivasa Prasad, Dejagow, Sutturu Sri and many others are participated in the 3 days kalasambrama. 25 artists are participated in the work shop.

== Literary works ==
Some of his notable works include "Shilpi Sankula", "Kalakosha", "Kalavida Kanda France", "Horatgara Kenchappa", "Beledu Banda Bharatiya Chitrakale" etc. Because of his multiple talents he was known as " Chaturmukha Brahma"(four faced brahma). He has many followers and admirers of his works, especially the paintings. Many associations and fan clunks regularly organise seminars and exhibitions of his paintings. There has been a demand to build a memorial in Bengaluru in recognition of his works.
