= Teru Malleshvara Temple, Hiriyur =

Teru Malleshvara swamy
- Hindu Temple
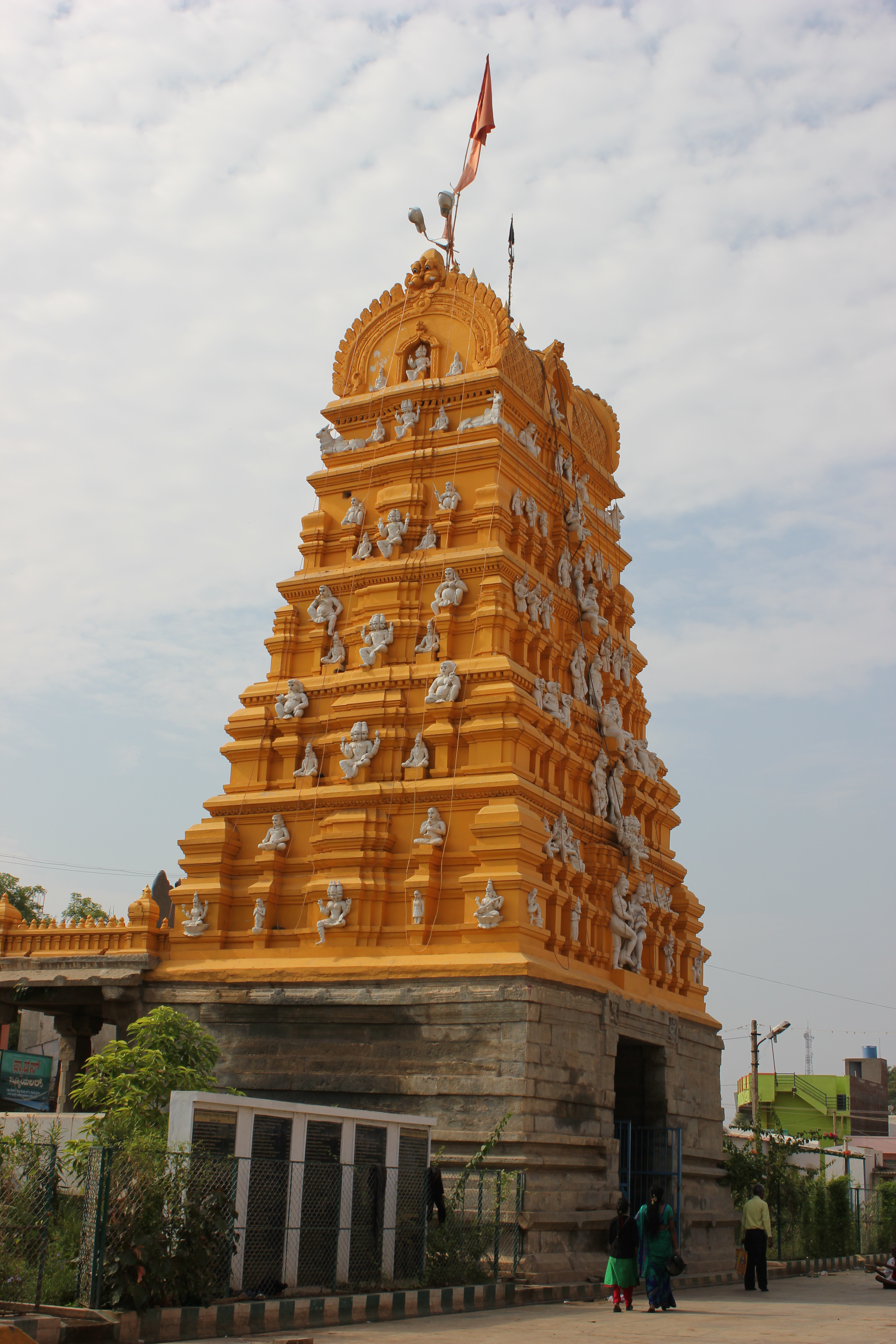
- Teru Malleshvara temple in Dravidian style at Hiriyur

- Location within Karnataka
- Coordinates: 13.95°N 76.62°E
- Country: India
- State: Karnataka
- District: Chitradurga
- Elevation: 630 m (2,070 ft)

Languages
  - Official: Kannada
- Time zone: UTC+5:30 (IST)

The Teru Malleshvara Hindu temple (also spelt Teru Malleshwara) is a Vijayanagara era temple in Hiriyur town near the historically important Chitradurga city in the Indian state of Karnataka. Hiriyur is situated on the right bank of the Vedavati river. The "Teru Malleshvara" fair (Jatra, a religious gathering with festivities) is celebrated annually for a week starting from the full moon in January or February (called magha). The Teru Malleshvara temple is a protected monument under the Karnataka state division of the Archaeological Survey of India

== Architecture ==
The temple exhibits the Dravidian style of architecture with a tall gopura (superstructure over entrance gate). The ceiling of the mukhmantapa (entrance hall) has murals depicting scenes from the "Shivpurana" (Hindu Shaiva epics) and the Ramayana (the Hindu Vaishnava epic). The temple dates built around c.1466, during rule of the Vijayanagara Empire.

== Gallery ==
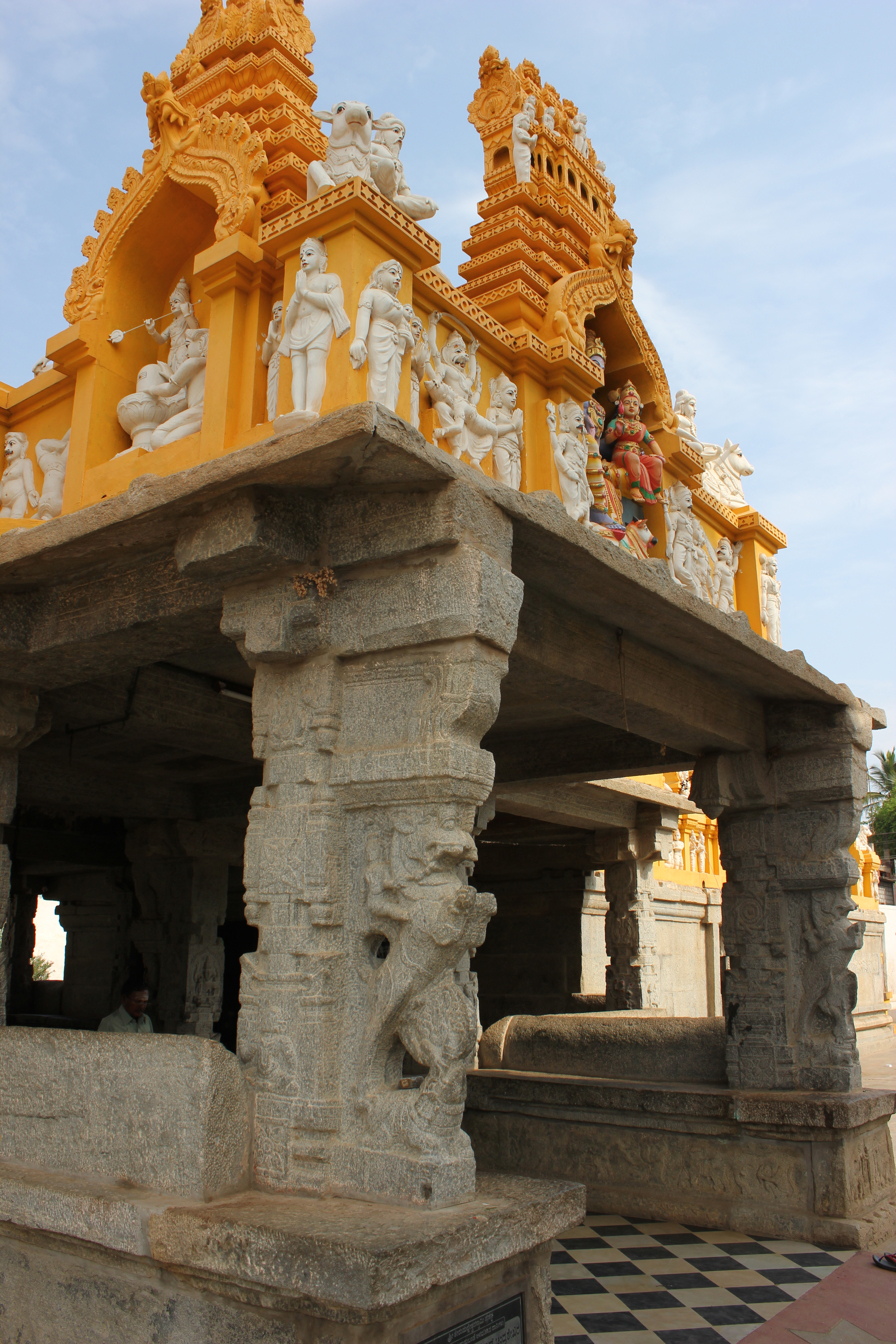
Entrance into mukhamantapa (entrance hall) at the Teru Malleshvara temple at Hiriyur

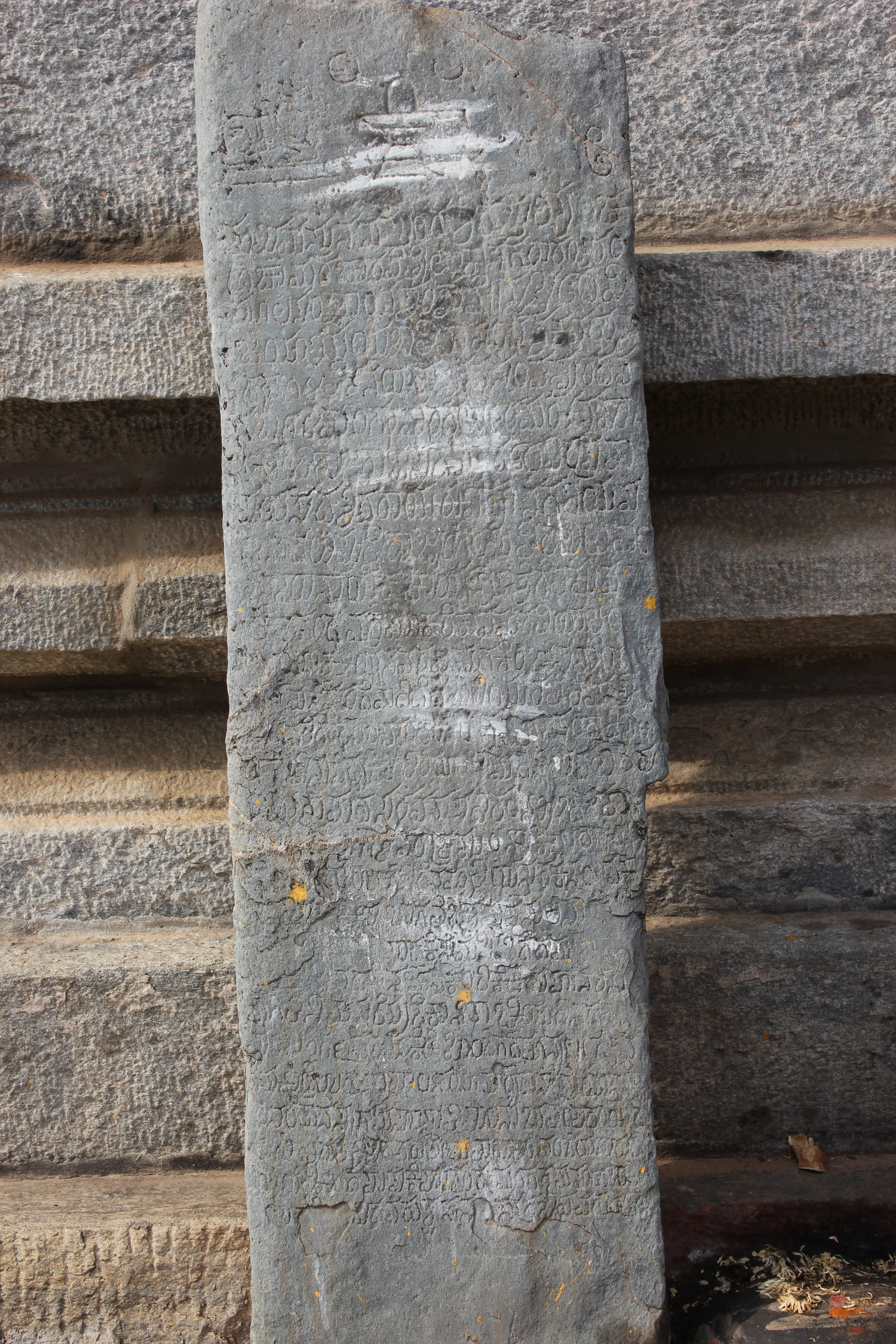
Kannada language inscription in the Teru Malleshvara temple at Hiriyur

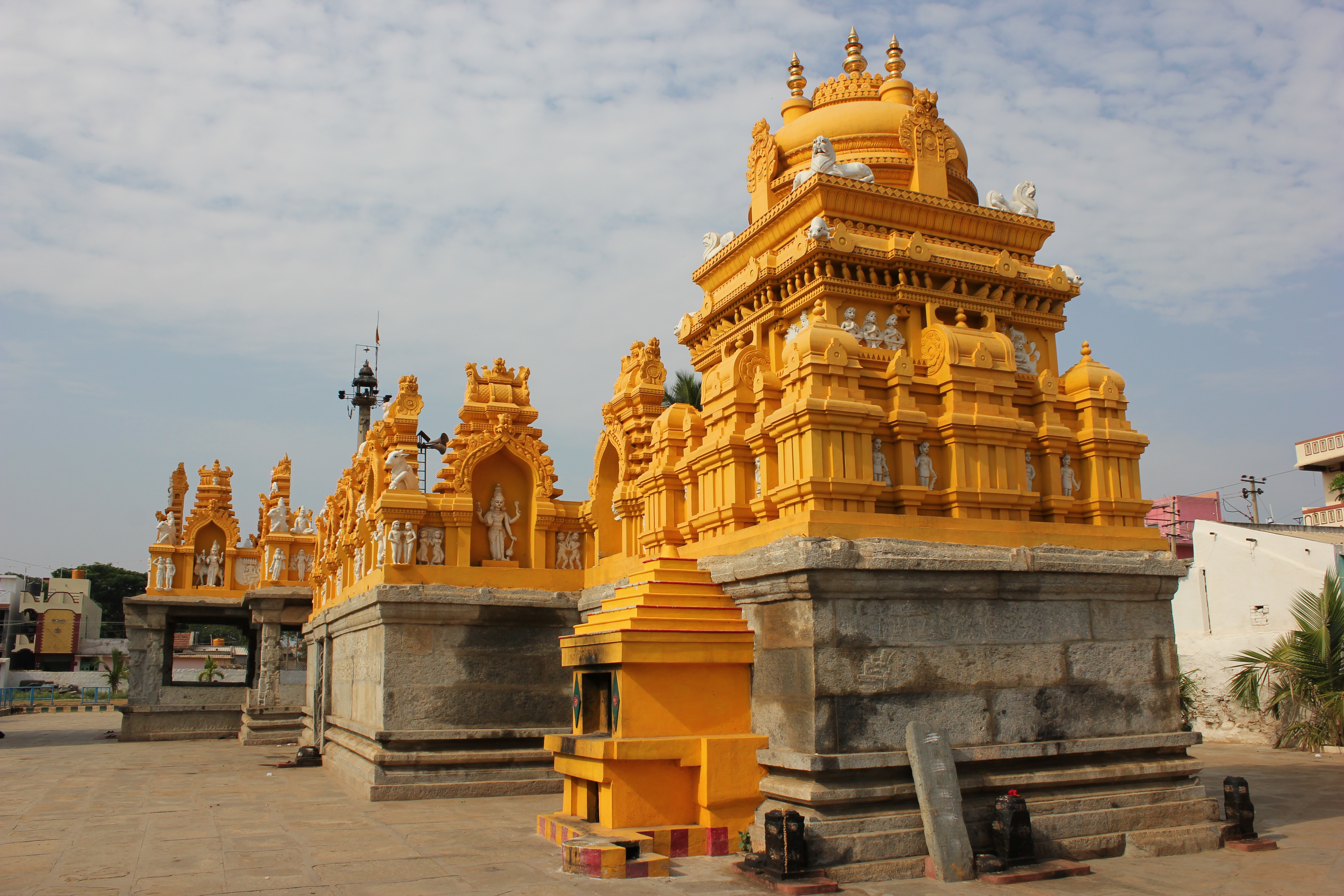
Ornate Dravidian style shikhara (superstructure over shrine) and sala roofs over mantapa walls in the Teru Malleshvara temple at Hiriyur
