= Benakanahalli =

- Village
- Country: India
- State: Karnataka
- District: Mysuru

Government
  - Type: Panchayat raj
  - Body: Gram panchayat Benakanahalli

Population (3000)
  - Total: 2,560

Languages
  - Official: Kannada
- Time zone: UTC+5:30 (IST)
- ISO 3166 code: IN-KA
- Vehicle registration: KA55
- Website: karnataka.gov.in

Benakanahalli is a village in mysuru district of Karnataka, India.

== Demographics ==
As of the 2011 Census of India there were 223 households in Benakanahalli and a total population of 1,237 consisting of 627 males and 610 females. There were 102 children ages 0–6.
