= Matadakurubarahatti =

- village
- Location in Karnataka, India Matadakurubarahatti (India)
- Coordinates: 14.22°N 76.40°E
- Country: India
- State: Karnataka
- District: Chitradurga
- Talukas: Chitradurga

Government
  - Type: Town Municipal Council
  - Body: Matadakurubarahatti Town Panchayat

Area
  - Total: 5 km^{2} (1.9 sq mi)

Population (2011)
  - Total: 5,884
  - Density: 1,268/km^{2} (3,280/sq mi)

Languages
  - Official: Kannada
- Time zone: UTC+5:30 (IST)

Matadakurubarahatti is a census town in Chitradurga district in the south Indian state of Karnataka.

== Demographics ==
As of 2001 India census, Matadakurubarahatti had a population of 5176 with 2905 males and 2271 females.

== See also ==
- Chitradurga
- Districts of Karnataka
