= Shivamurthy Murugha Sharanaru =

Indian seer and pontiff

- Born: April 11, 1958 (age 68); Godabanahal, Chitradurga, India
- Education: University of Mysore
- Occupations: Philanthropy, educator, Head of Murugha Mutt
- Years active: 1991–present
- Organization: Sri Jagadguru Murugharajendra Vidyapeetha
- Predecessor: Sri Mallikarjuna Murugharajendra Swamiji
- Honours: Honorary Doctarate

Shivamurthy Murugha Sharanaru (born 11 April 1958) is an Indian seer and pontiff belonging to the prominent Lingayat community mainly based in the state of Karnataka. He became the head of Muruga Rajendra Mata in 1991, succeeding Mallikarjuna Murugharajendra Swami. The seer has influenced peers of groups and mainly worked toward the eradication of the evils of the caste system and the removal of inequality and poverty, and helped to find homes for orphan children and elderly people. He has strengthened voices for reservations and requirements for the community and has led protests seeking the same.

== Early life ==
Shivamurty was born in a village called Godabanahal, in Chitradurga where he completed his early education. He graduated from the University of Mysore before returning to his hometown and being influenced by the Murugha Mutt. He was named successor to the throne of Murugha Mutt by his predecessor Sri Mallikarjuna Murugharajendra Swami, who witnessed his dedication and spiritual attitudes and the works towards the Mutt. He succeeded his predecessor in 1991.

== Career ==
After taking in-charge of office as the seer, he revoked all the religious blind practices held in the mutt, as per the Basava philosophy. He also indulged himself in service to the society, by bringing in progressive thinking and outlooks towards practices. There has nearly been 12 institutions, including schools, hostels, hospitals and other organizations around the city of Chitradurga. Presently he is serving as the president of spiritual Vidyapeeth under which around 150 institutions are running.

== Criminal charges ==
In August 2022, two minor high school girls who studied and lived in the Murugha Mutt's hostel in Chitradurga accused the seer of sexual assault and harassment. An FIR filed on behalf of the two girls accused the seer of 'sexually abusing' them for a couple of years. Four associates of the seer were also accused of abetting and colluding. A POCSO case was registered, and the seer was house-arrested from Bankhapura town and brought for questioning on the Mutt's premises. The seer proclaimed that he would settle if the girls confessed to a false accusation or would fight the case legally. The seer dubbed the matter a "big conspiracy against him, and the truth will be revealed soon." In response, the Karnataka Chief Minister Basavaraj Bommai, who hails from the Lingayat community, affirmed that the charges would be investigated. In early September, the seer was officially arrested and remanded to police custody by the district magistrate.

In October 2022, while the seer was still in prison, two more cases of sexual assault on minors were lodged, by the parents of the children, and fresh FIRs were filed under the POCSO act. In this circumstance, calls for change in the head of institution arose and a retired judge was given Power of Attorney.
