= Challakere =

Challakere second bombay
- City
- Location in Karnataka, India
- Coordinates: 14.312°N 76.651°E
- Country: India
- State: Karnataka
- District: Chitradurga
- Region: Bayaluseemē

Government
  - Body: Municipality council

Area
  - City: 30.71 km^{2} (11.86 sq mi)
  - Rural: 2,032.13 km^{2} (784.61 sq mi)
- Elevation: 585 m (1,919 ft)

Population (2011)
  - City: 55,194
  - Density: 1,797/km^{2} (4,655/sq mi)
  - Rural: 310,590

Languages
  - Official: Kannada
- Time zone: UTC+5:30 (IST)
- PIN: 577 522
- Telephone code: 08195
- Vehicle registration: KA-16
- Website: www.challakerecity.mrc.gov.in

Challakere is a city, municipality, and taluk in Chitradurga district in the state of Karnataka, India.

== Geography ==
Challakere is located at 14.312°N 76.651°E. It has an average elevation of 585 metres (1919 ft).

== Demographics ==
Challakere is the largest taluk of Chitradurga District. As of 2011 India census, Challakere has a population of 55,194.

== Science and research organizations ==
Challakere is 200 km from Bangalore where an integrated township spread over 8,000 acres (32 km^{2}) has been set up by Indian Space Research Organization (ISRO), Defence Research and Development Organization (DRDO), Indian Institute of Science (IISc) and Bhabha Atomic Research Centre (BARC).

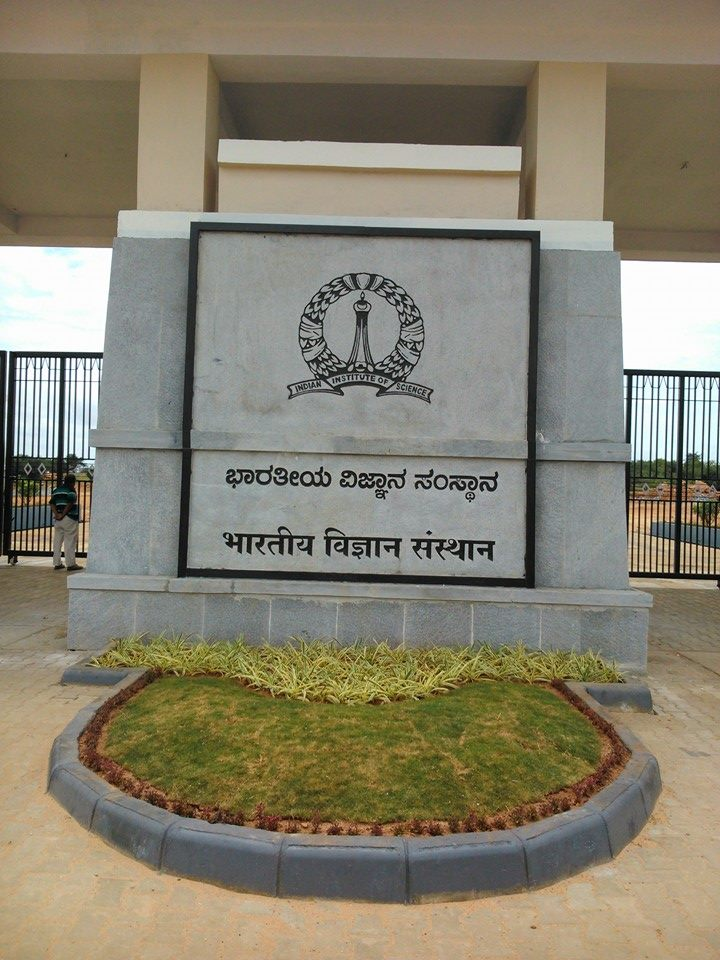
IISc Challakere Campus entrance

== Oil industry ==
It is the second largest producer/supplier of edible oil after Mumbai. There are as many as 60+ oil industries in Challakere. Not only oil, several other industries like dal, fried gram, rice, etc. are also present. The commercial activity in the town is comparable to that of a standard district and the district enjoys a huge business turnover out of town's business.

== Spiritual places ==
- Nayakanahatti Sri Thipperudraswamy Temple
- Datta Mandira – located in Tyagaraja Nagar, and traditional practices of Datta Sampradaya, can be seen at this temple.
- Jagalurajja temple (Ajjana Gudi) – located beside the Ajjana Kere, which is the main water source for surrounding wells and drinking water for Challakere
- Challekeramma temple – Challakeramma Jathre is conducted once every five years.
- Bhavani Shankara temple – situated at Lakshmipura, was bought from Varanasi more than 200 years back without being kept on the floor to maintain the sanctity of the idol.

== Transport ==
Challakere is well connected to Bangalore, Ballari and Chitradurga by road. The National Highway 150A (India) that connects Chamarajanagara to Jevargi passes through the town. Challakere is 30 km from its district headquarter, Chitradurga and 200 km from state capital Bangalore.

Challakere also has a railway station (station code: CHKE) under the South Western Railway Zone of Indian Railways. It lies on the Chikjajur – Ballari Line.

The nearest international airport, Kempegowda International Airport, is 229 km from Challakere.

== Education ==
- Pragati Vidyalaya
- Infant Jesus School
- Infant Jesus High School
- Veda School, Sanikere
- Veda residential PU College, Sanikere
- Government Engineering College
- Government First Grade College
- Government P. U. College
- Government Tool Room And Training Centre (GTTC)
- Mahatma Gandhi English Medium High School (MGEMHS)
- Vinod English School (VES)
- Warriors English School
- Warriors P. U. College
- BMGHS
- Vasavi English Medium High School
- Sri Chythanya School

== Notable people ==
- Challakere brothers – known for chanting of Vedas
- Ta Ra Subba Rao – renowned Kannada novelist
- C. K. Jaffer Sharief

== Gallery ==
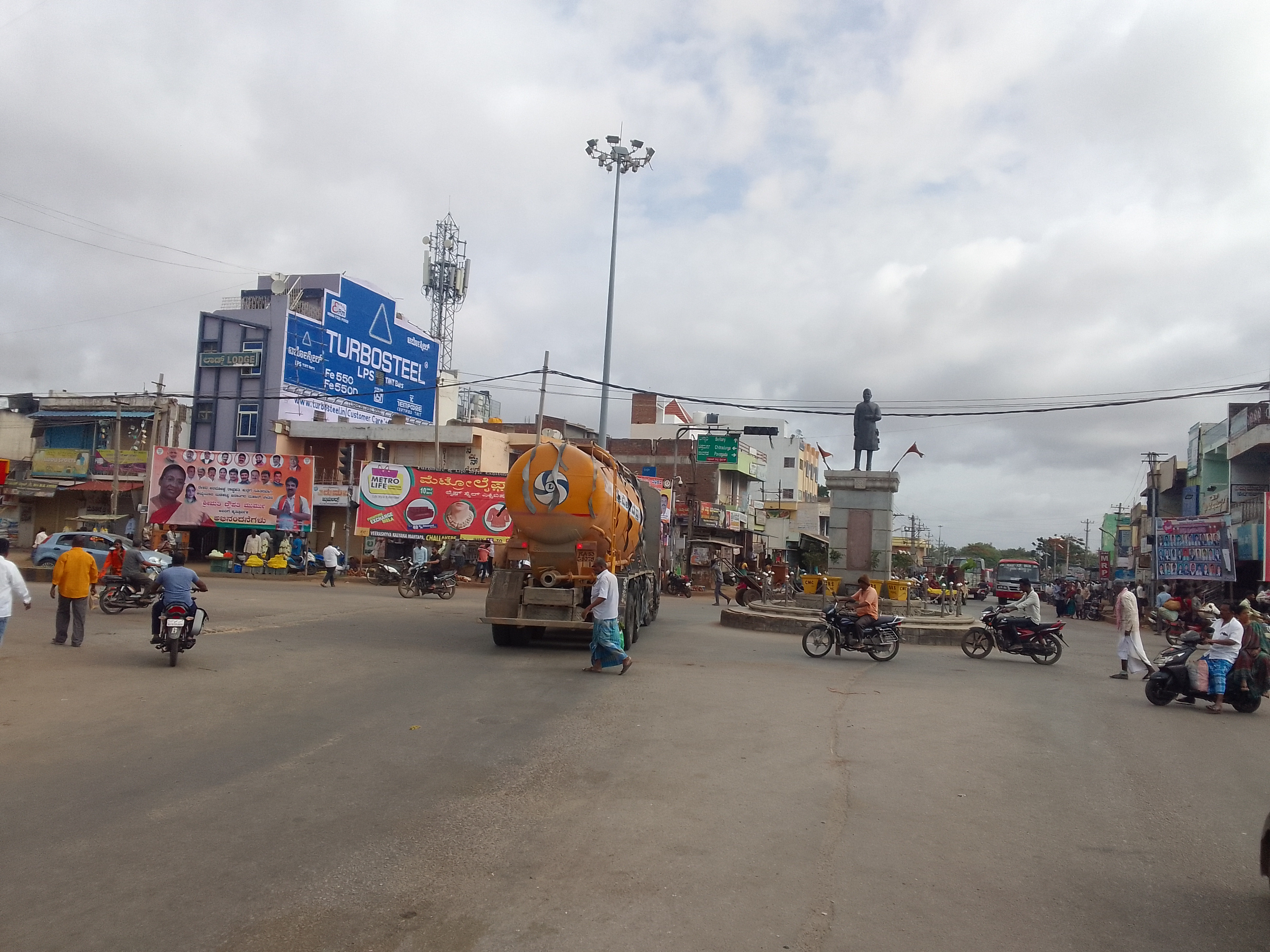
Challakere

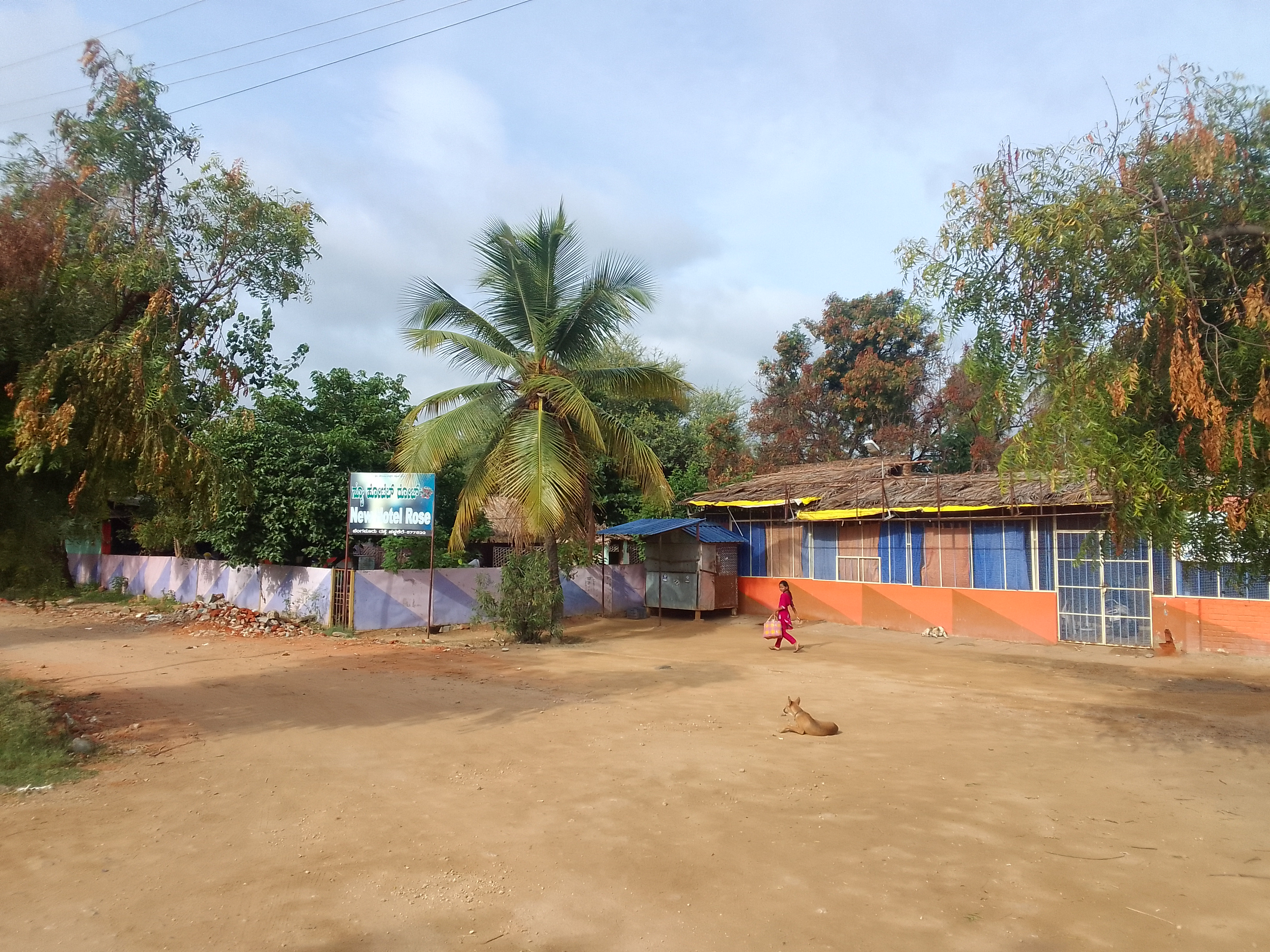
Rose Cafe

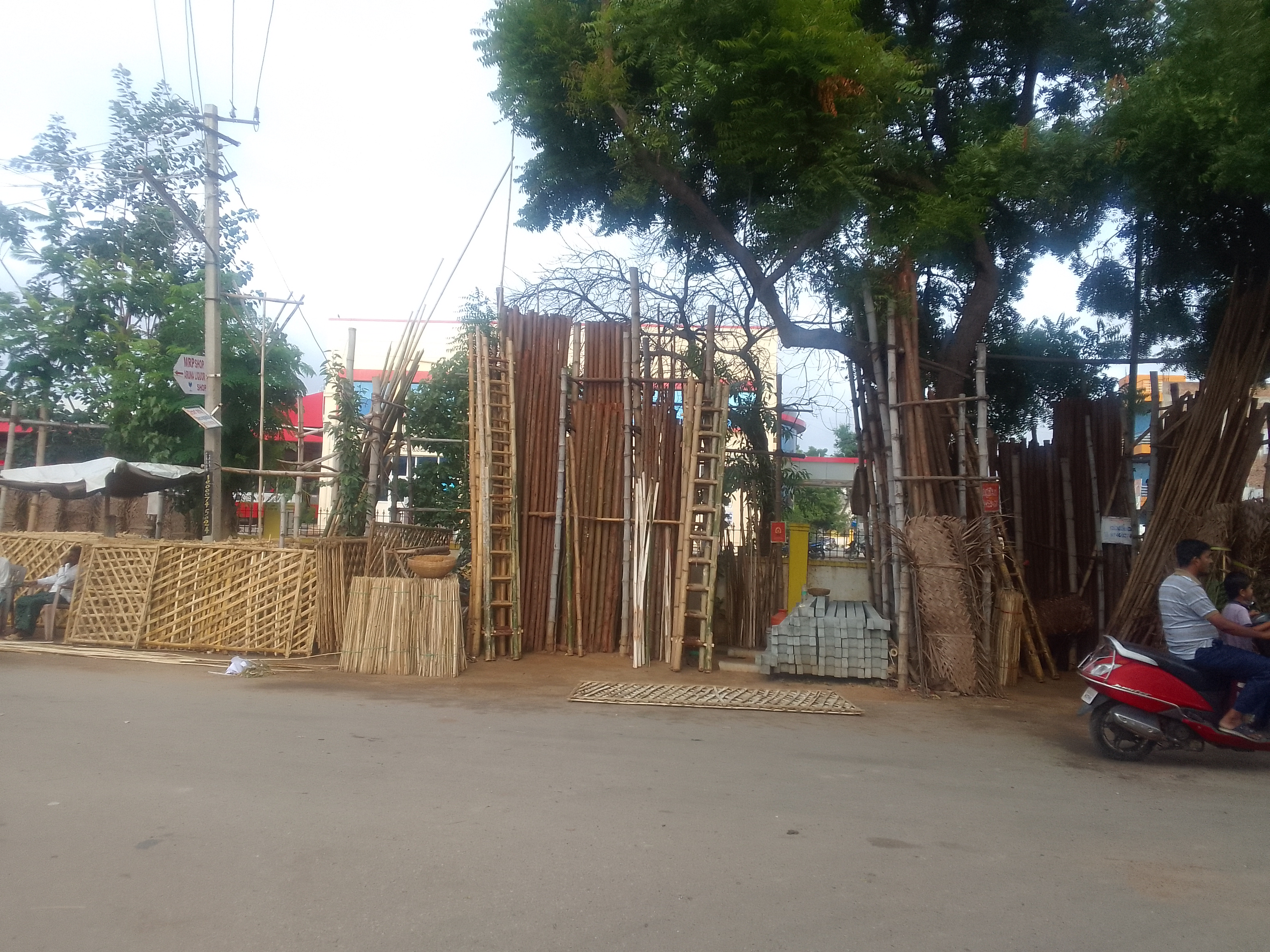
Bamboo craft

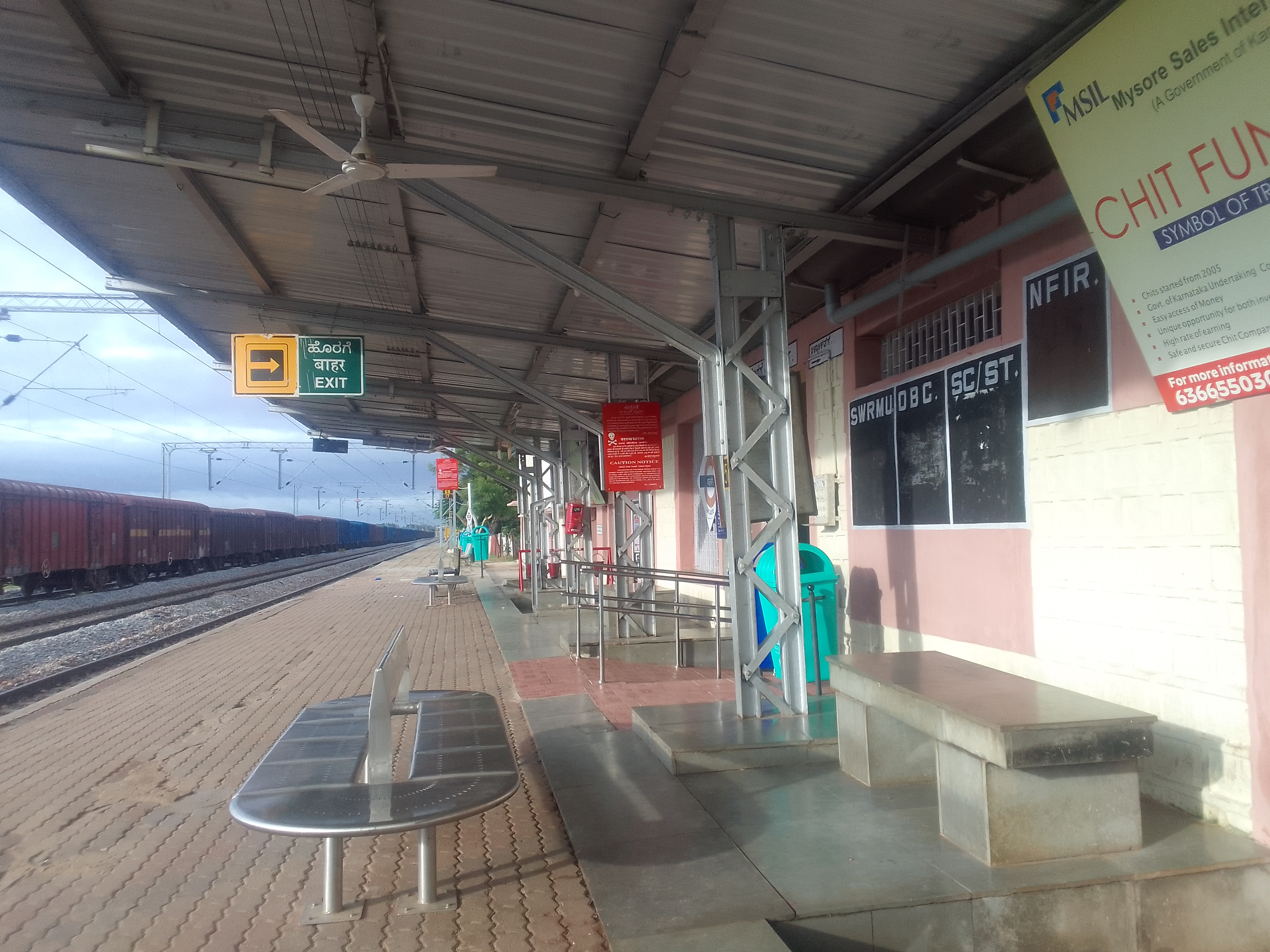
Railway station

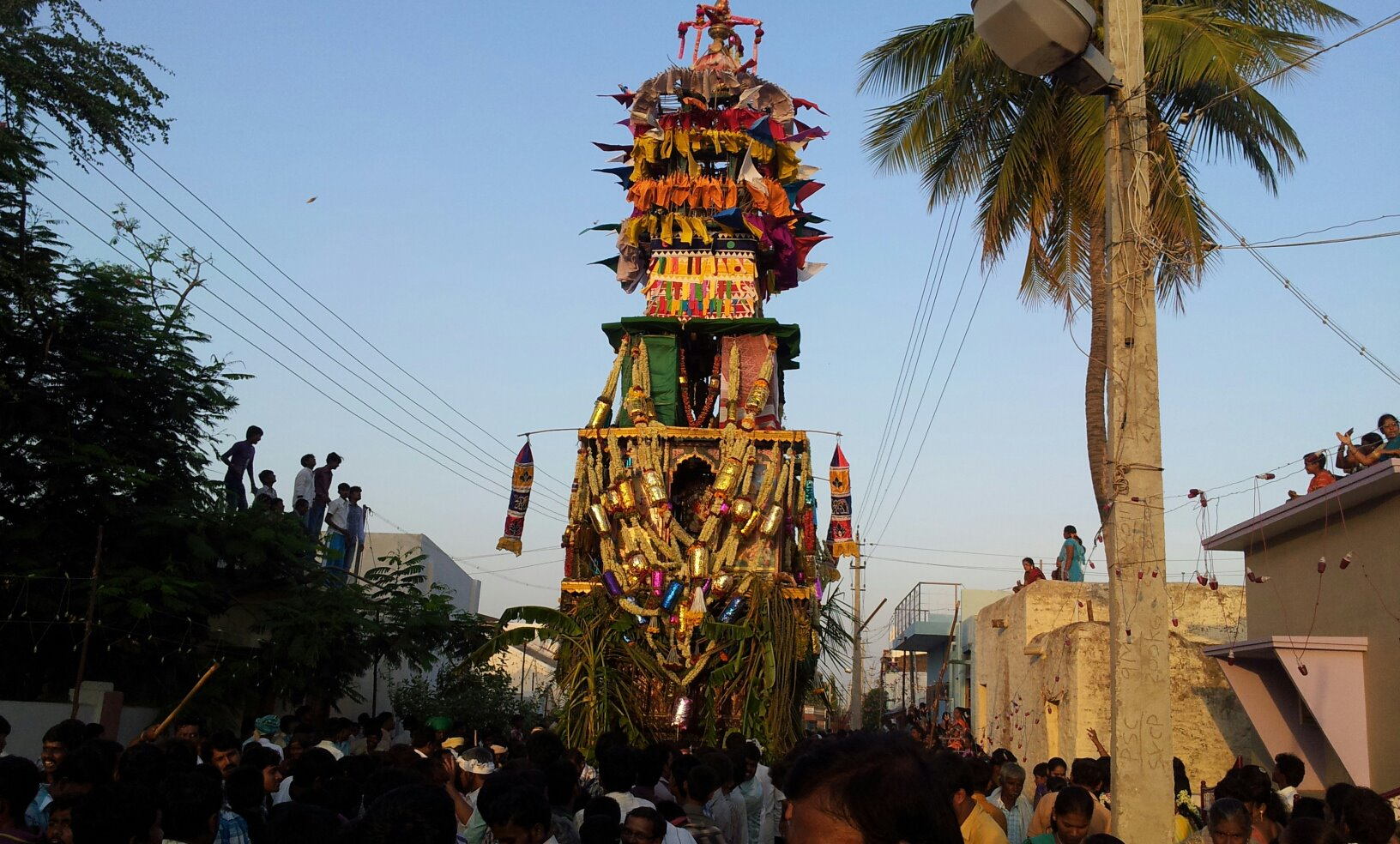
Rathotsava

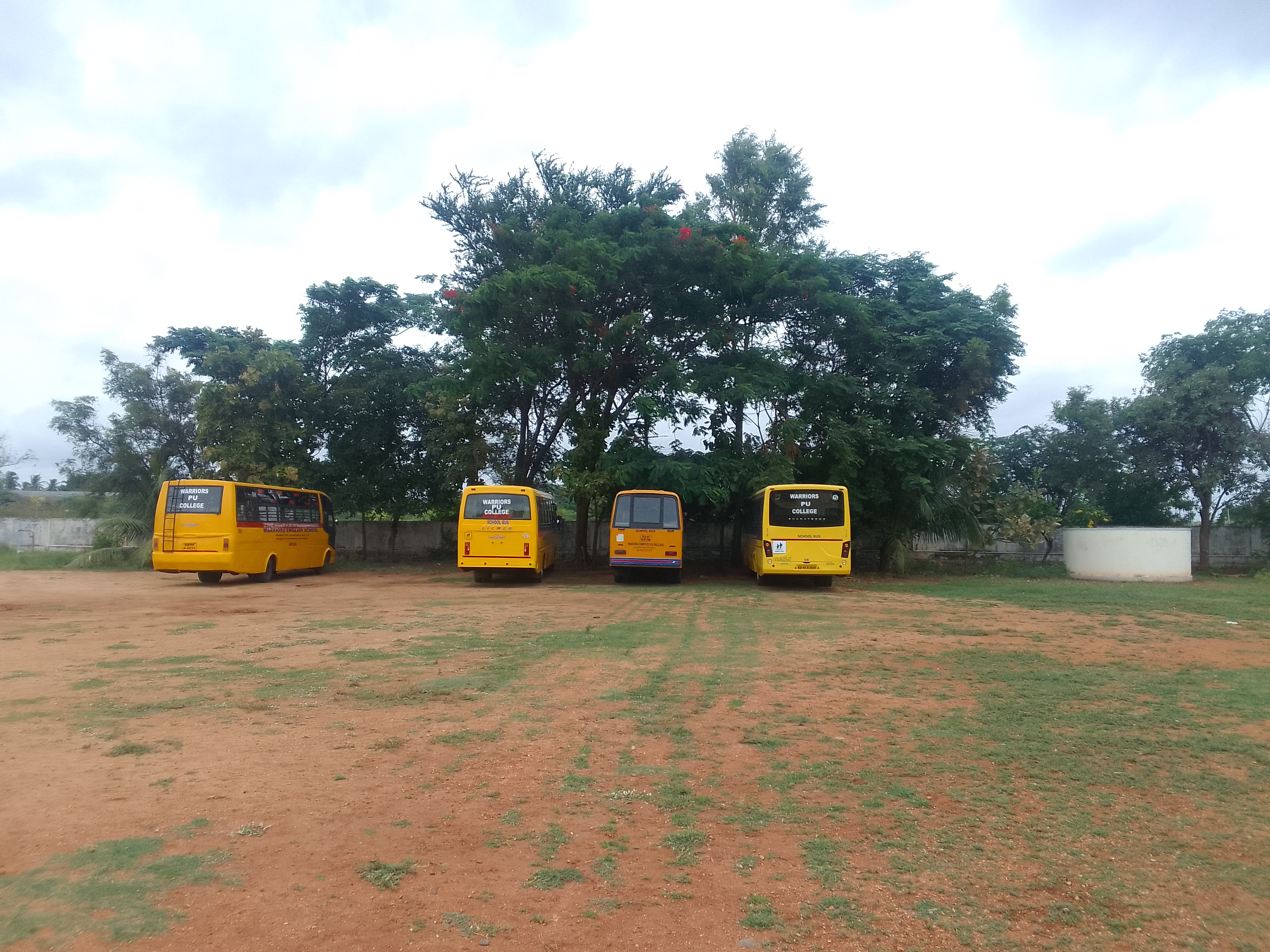
Warriors School

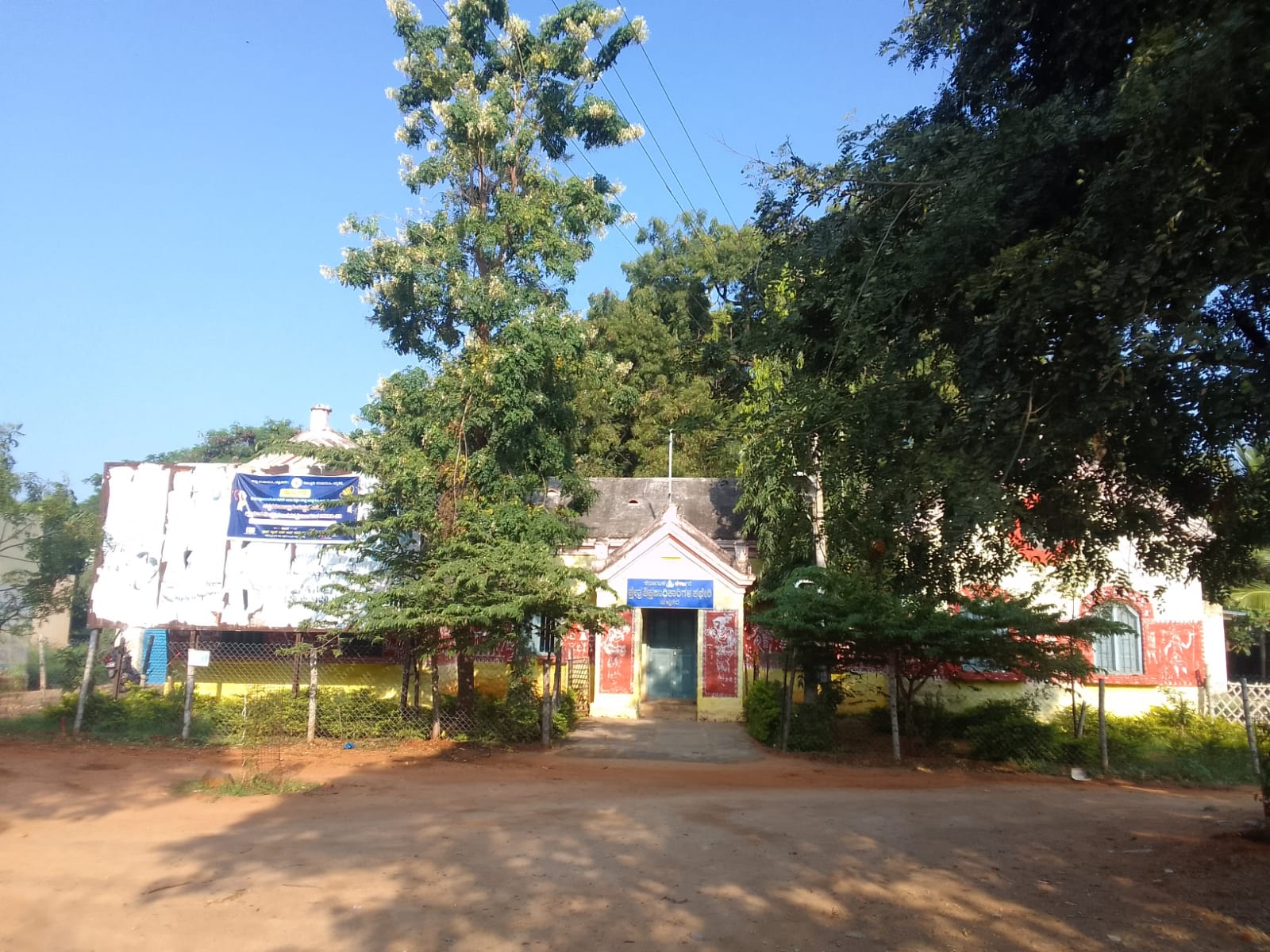
School Inspector Office

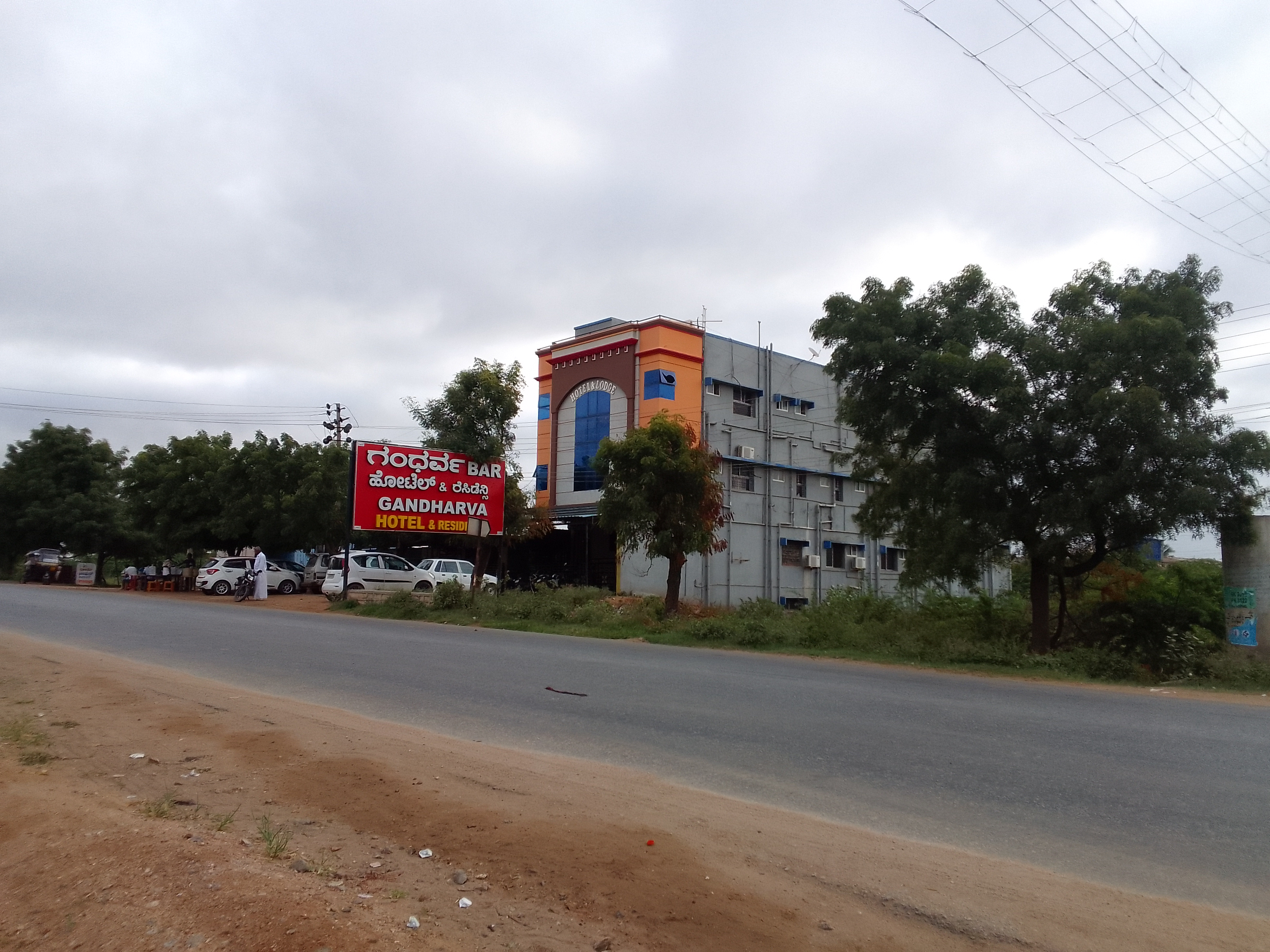
Gandharva Cafe
