= Hiriyur =

- Town
- Location within Karnataka
- Coordinates: 13.95°N 76.62°E
- Country: India
- State: Karnataka
- District: Chitradurga

Government
  - Body: City Municipal Council

Area
  - Town: 29.13 km^{2} (11.25 sq mi)
  - Rural: 1,681.06 km^{2} (649.06 sq mi)
- Elevation: 630 m (2,070 ft)

Population (2011)
  - Town: 56,416
  - Density: 1,937/km^{2} (5,016/sq mi)
  - Rural: 229,717

Languages
  - Official: Kannada
- Time zone: UTC+5:30 (IST)
- PIN: 577 598 & 577 599
- Telephone code: 08193
- Vehicle registration: KA-16
- Website: http://www.hiriyurcity.mrc.gov.in/

Hiriyur or Hiriyūru is a town and a taluk headquarter located in Chitradurga district in the Indian state of Karnataka.

Hiriyur is situated along National Highway 48. Hiriyur is located 160 km north-west of Bengaluru. All the buses from Bengaluru going towards Hubballi, Belgavi, Davanagere, Ballari travel through Hiriyur.

The climate is generally dry with low rain fall. During winter (November - February), the night temperature may come down to 18 degrees C.

== History ==
Hiriyur is famous as a centre for regional (rural) markets. The 'santhe' attracts people from all over the district.

C N Malige is one of the villages of Hiriyur taluk and it is situated between Hulithotlu and Adiralu villages. Sub office to this village is Aimangala. The National Highway 4 which passes through Hiriyur has for decades created a cluster of business catering to the commuters. Hiriyur is also famous for its 500+ years old temple of Shiva. Famously known as Teru Malleshvara Temple, Hiriyur it is also called as "Dakshina Kashi" by the devotees. It is believed that the famous devotee of Lord Shiva, "Hema Reddy Mallamma", was a resident of this town. Every year she travelled to Varanasi by foot. As she grew older and weaker, one day she prayed to her lord that "O lord I have become old and weak, unable to visit Varanasi and have your darshan, what do I do". On the night of that day Lord Shiva appeared in her dream and told her that she need not come to Varanasi to see him, he himself will come and reside in Hiriyur. As promised, Lord Shiva was believed to have incarnated in the "oralukallu" (a stone of cylindrical shape used in the households of ancient India for grinding purpose). That stone which was worshipped by Mallamma later became known as Terumalleshwara.

The ancient name of Hiriyur was "Ghanapuri". The "Yeppattu Kannina Setuve" ("the seventy eyed bridge") located near Hiriyur is noted for its architecture. The patterns in the bridge resemble human eye, and there are seventy eyes.

== Geography ==
Hiriyur is located at 13.95°N 76.62°E. It has an average elevation of 630 metres (2066 feet). The months of March and April are the hottest months of the year. The Vedavati River is dammed here to meet the water needs of the otherwise mostly dry district of Chitradurga.

== National Geological Monument ==
The pillow lava at Mardihalli village near Hiriyur have been declared a National Geological Monument by the Geological Survey of India, for their protection, maintenance, promotion and enhancement of geotourism.

== Demographics ==
According to 2011 Census of India, Hiriyur had a population of 56,416. Males constitute 49.85% of the population and females 50.15%. Hiriyur has an average literacy rate of 83.63%, higher than the national average of 74.04%: male literacy is 88.48%, and female literacy is 78.85%. In Hiriyur, 10.44% of the population is under 6 years of age.

== Transportation ==
This place lies on NH-48, the Mumbai-Bangalore National Highway, and is a central place for most commuters travelling to southern and central parts of India via Karnataka. Several villages around Hiriyur like Adivala, have been major producers of coconuts.

== See also ==
- Chitradurga
- Hosadurga
- Davanagere
- Aimangala
