= Chitradurga district =

- District of Karnataka
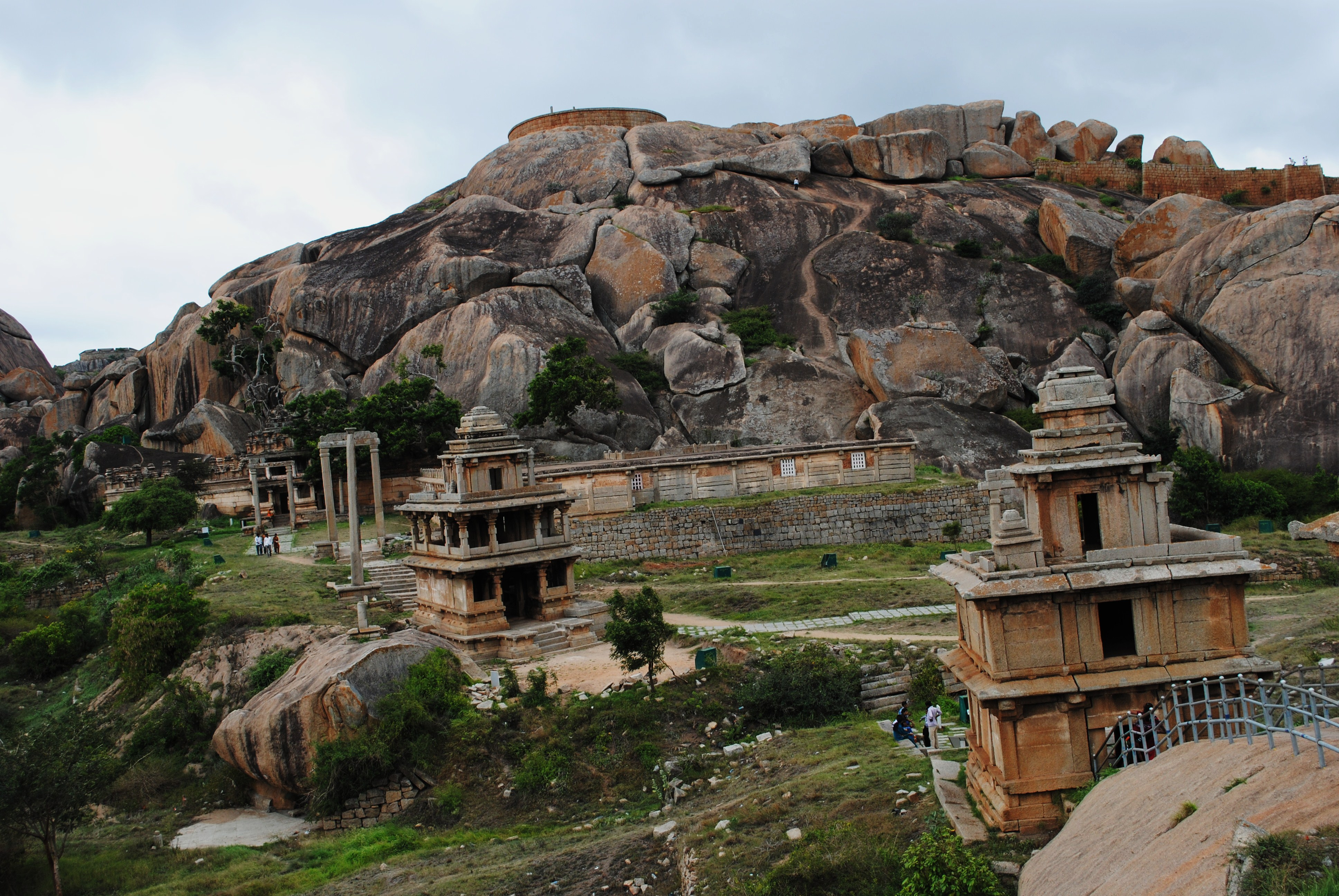
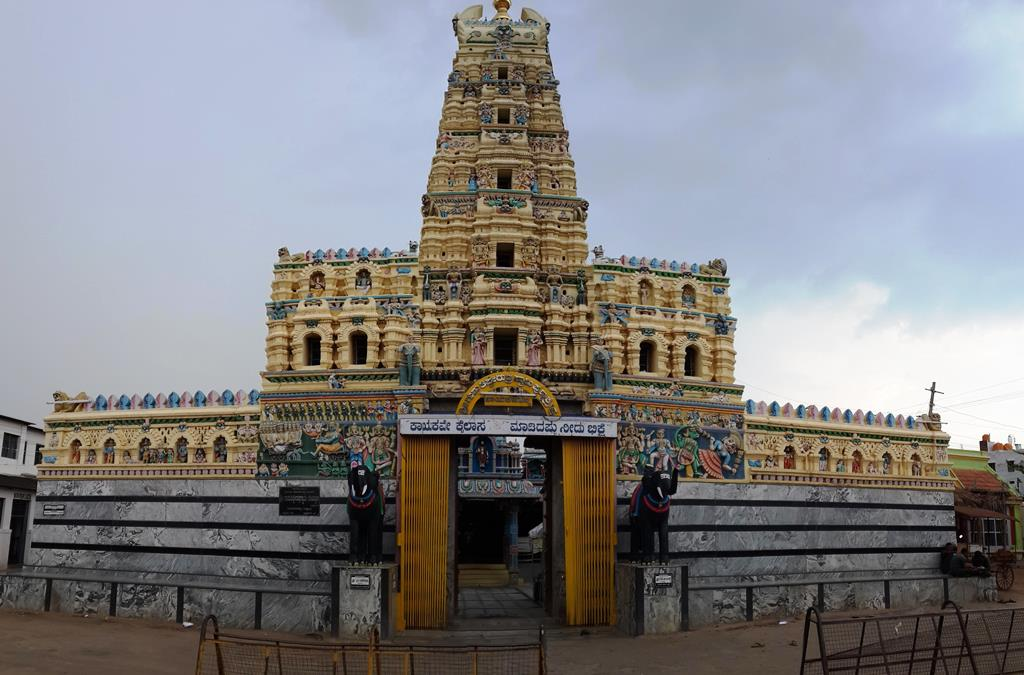
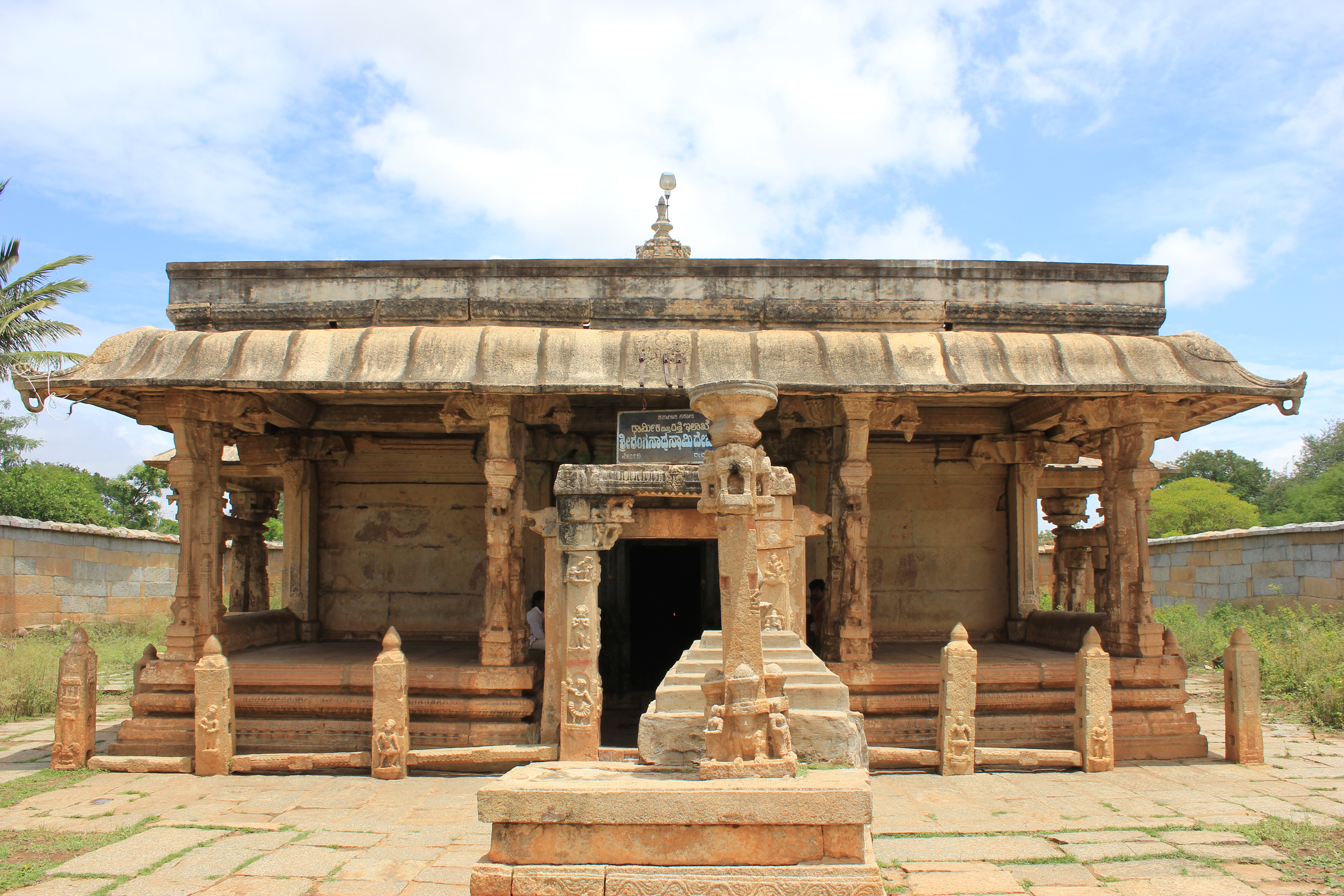
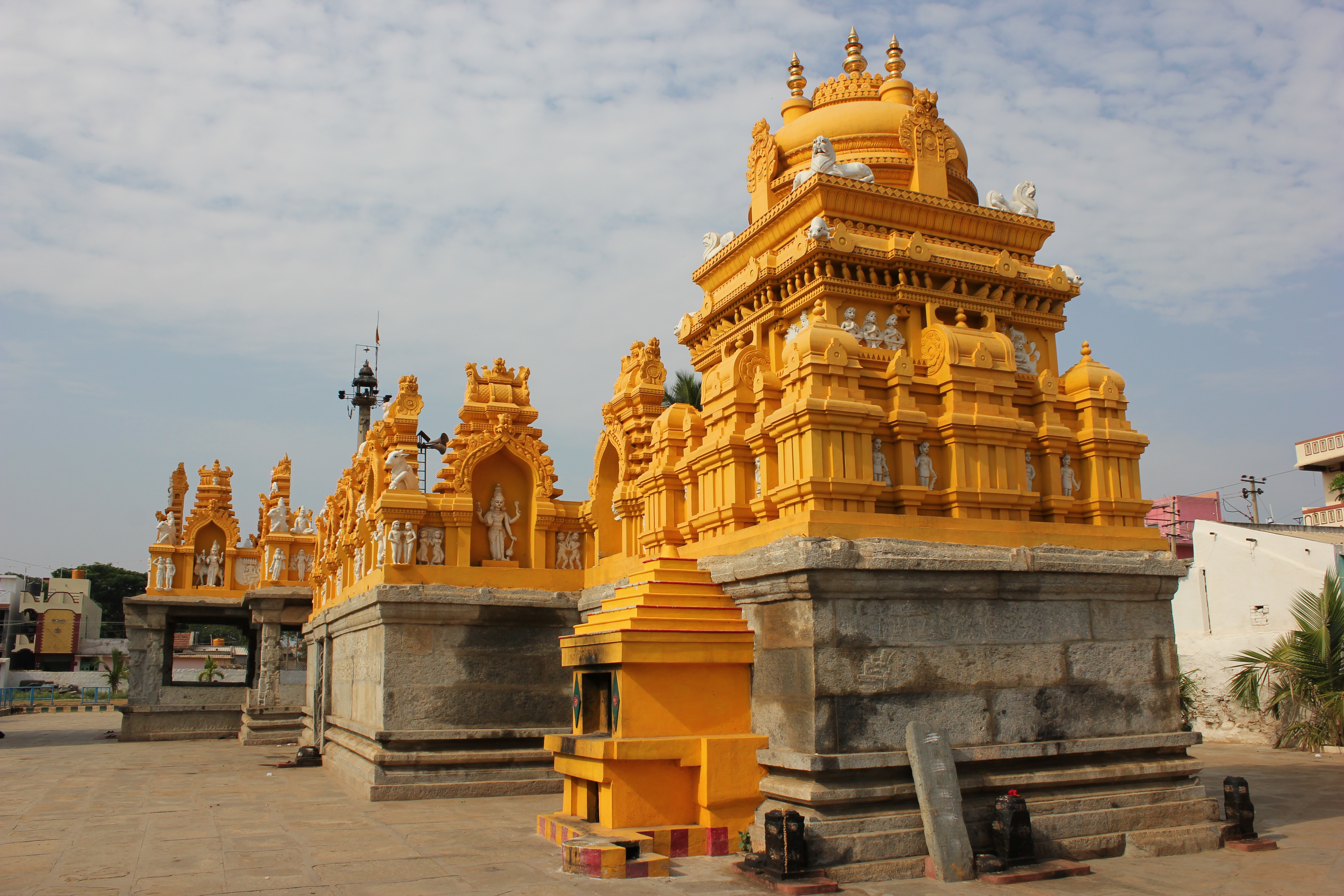
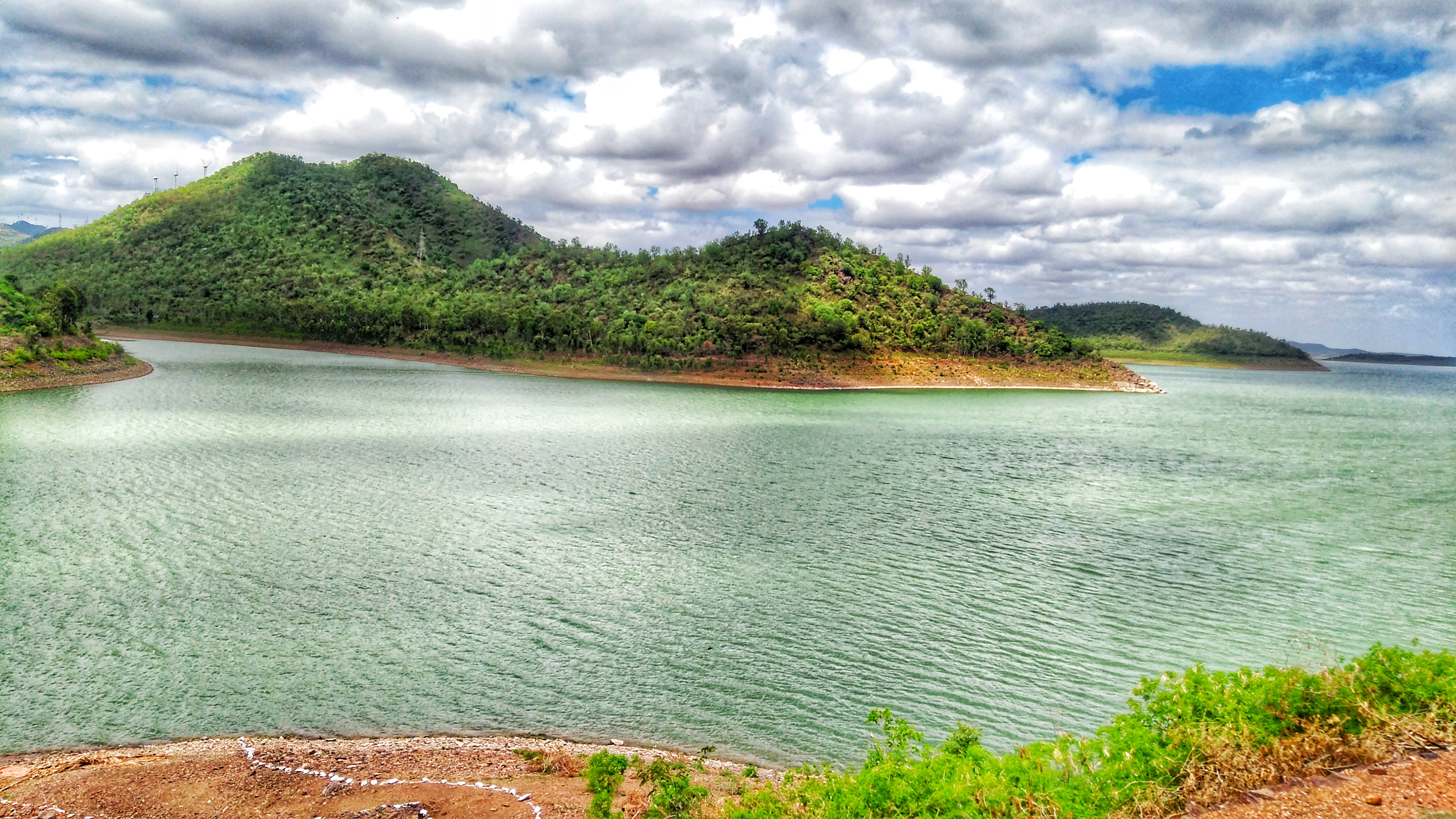
- Clockwise from top-left: Chitradurga Fort, Nayakanahatti temple, Teru Malleshwara Temple at Hiriyur, Vani Vilasa Sagara, in Hosadurga.
- Interactive map of Chitradurga district
- Coordinates: 14.00°N 76.50°E
- Country: India
- State: Karnataka
- Division: Bangalore Division
- Headquarters: Chitradurga
- Talukas: Challakere; Chitradurga; Hiriyur; Holalkere; Hosdurga; Molakalmuru

Government
  - Deputy Commissioner: Shri. Venkatesh T. (IAS)
  - Member of Parliament: Govind Karjol
  - Superintendent of Police: Ranjith Kumar Bandaru, I.P.S.

Area
  - Total: 8,440 km^{2} (3,260 sq mi)
- Elevation (Highest): 1,094 m (3,589 ft)

Population (2011)
  - Total: 1,659,456
  - Density: 197/km^{2} (509/sq mi)

Languages
  - Official: Kannada
- Time zone: UTC+5:30 (IST)
- PIN: 577 501, 502, 577524
- Telephone code: + 91 (8194)
- ISO 3166 code: IN-KA-CT
- Vehicle registration: Chitradurga KA-16
- Sex ratio: 1.047 ♂/♀
- Literacy: 73.82%
- Lok Sabha constituency: Chitradurga Lok Sabha constituency
- Precipitation: 522 millimetres (20.6 in)
- Website: chitradurga.nic.in

Chitradurga district is an administrative district of Karnataka state in southwestern India. The city Chitradurga is the district headquarters. Chitradurga city gets its name from 'Chitrakaldurga', meaning 'picturesque castle' in Kannada.

== History ==
Chitradurga district has been inhabited since at least neolithic period as per archeologists. A rock carving of Emperor Ashoka near Bharamagiri provides evidence that the district was part of the Mauryan Empire.

Subsequently, the region was under the rule of the Shathavahanas, Kadambas, Chalukyas, Rashtrakutas, and Hoysalas. A boulder engraving near village Chandravalli mentions Kadamba King Mayurasaram.

The Nayakas, also known as Palegars, are most well associated with the district due to their significant historical presence. The Nayaka period began around the late 16th century. There were local chiefs, who were governed under the Vijayanagara Empire, became independent after the fall of the empire and established a stronghold in Chitradurga. A notable Nayaka was Bharamappa Nayaka (1689–1721), considered "the greatest of the Nayaka rulers" for his military victories and resistance to Mughal incursions. The final ruler, Madakari Nayaka V (1758–1779), was known for his leadership and diplomacy between the Maratha Empire and Hyder Ali of Mysore. Later, he also resisted multiple sieges by Hyder Ali, but the fort ultimately fell in 1779. During the last siege, Onake Obavva, the wife of a fort guard, single-handedly defended a secret passage against enemy entry. She became known for her heroic act and is regarded as a symbol of Chitradurga.

The fort was subsequently expanded by Hyder Ali and his son Tipu Sultan before coming under the control of the Royal Mysore family after Tipu Sultan's defeat by the British.

== Mythology ==
It is believed that the few natural formation are attributed to link to Ramayana and Mahabharata.

Tradition dates Chitradurga District to the period of the Ramayana and Mahabharata. The whole district lies in the valley of the Vedavati River, with the Tungabhadra River flowing in the northwest. During the British times it was named Chitaldroog or Chitaldrug. The district was practically ruled by all the well known dynasties that ruled Karnataka. A historical places like Jain basadi of Heggere, a pilgrimage centre for Jain's in district.

Administrative map of Chitradurga

== Demographics ==
Religions in Chitradurga district (2011)
Religion	Per cent
Hinduism	91.63%
Islam	7.76%
Other or not stated	0.61%

According to the 2011 census Chitradurga district has a population of 1,659,456, roughly equal to the nation of Guinea-Bissau or the US state of Idaho. This gives it a ranking of 297th in India (out of a total of 640). The district has a population density of 197 inhabitants per square kilometre (510/sq mi). Its population growth rate over the decade 2001–2011 was 9.39%. Chitradurga has a sex ratio of 969 females for every 1000 males, and a literacy rate of 73.82%. 19.86% of the population lives in urban areas. Scheduled Castes and Scheduled Tribes make up 23.45% and 18.23% of the population respectively.

Historical population
Year	Pop.	±% p.a.
1901	354,308	—
1911	393,953	+1.07%
1921	408,588	+0.37%
1931	462,953	+1.26%
1941	505,565	+0.88%
1951	588,497	+1.53%
1961	741,344	+2.34%
1971	899,257	+1.95%
1981	1,089,304	+1.94%
1991	1,312,717	+1.88%
2001	1,517,896	+1.46%
2011	1,659,456	+0.90%

Languages of Chitradurga district (2011)
1. Kannada (83.3%)
2. Urdu (7.33%)
3. Telugu (5.39%)
4. Lambadi (2.29%)
5. Others (1.66%)

At the time of the 2011 census, 83.33% of the population spoke Kannada, 7.33% Urdu, 5.39% Telugu and 2.29% Lambadi as their first language.

== Economy ==
In 2006, the Ministry of Panchayati Raj named Chitradurga one of the country's 250 most backward districts (out of a total of 640). It is one of the five districts in Karnataka currently receiving funds from the Backward Regions Grant Fund Programme (BRGF).

== Education ==
- Sri Shivakumara Rangaprayoga Shale

== People ==
- Madakari Nayaka – King of Chitradurga
- Onake Obavva – Legendary woman who fought Hyder Ali's army.
- Malladihalli Sri Raghavendra Swamiji (Tiruka) – yogi and Ayurvedic guru
- S. Nijalingappa (vinayak) – politician, ex-CM, ex-MP and ex All India Congress lead
- T.R. Subba Rao (TaRaSu) – a novelist, 1985 winner of Sahitya Akademi Award for his novel Durgasthamana
- Tirumalai Krishnamacharya – yogi and Ayurvedic guru. One of the most influential yoga teachers of the 20th century and is credited with the revival of hatha yoga. Also called father of Modern Yoga.
- P. R. Thippeswamy (PRT) – Artist, Writer & Folklorist – K. Venkatappa Awardee 1999, ex-Chairman Karnataka Lalithakala Academy

== See also ==
- Districts of Karnataka
