= Chitradurga =

- City
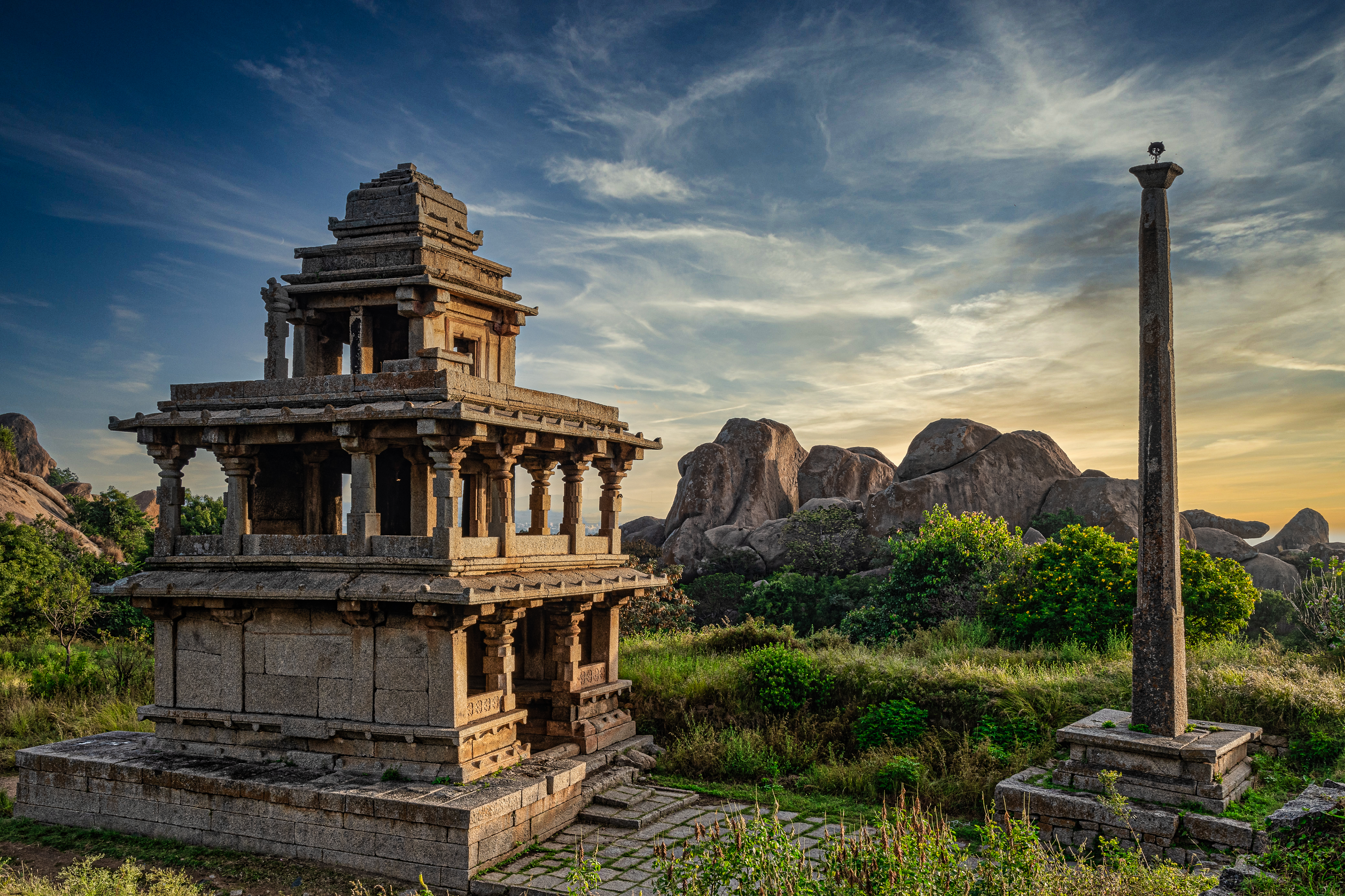
- Historic temple in Chitradurga
- Nickname: Fort City (Kote Nadu)
- Interactive map of Chitradurga
- Coordinates: 14.23°N 76.4°E
- Country: India
- State: Karnataka
- District: Chitradurga
- Established: 1465
- Founder: Thimmanna Nayaka

Government
  - Body: City Municipal Council
  - MP: Govind Karjol

Area
  - City: 62 km^{2} (24 sq mi)
  - Rural: 1,350.76 km^{2} (521.53 sq mi)
- Elevation: 732 m (2,402 ft)

Population (2011)
  - City: 145,853
  - Density: 2,400/km^{2} (6,100/sq mi)
  - Rural: 283,673
- Demonym(s): Durgan, Durgans, Durgadavaru
- Time zone: UTC+5:30 (IST)
- PIN: 577501, 577502, 577524
- Telephone code: 08194
- Vehicle registration: KA-16
- Official language: Kannada
- Website: chitradurgacity.mrc.gov.in

Chitradurga is a city and the headquarters of Chitradurga district, which is located on the valley of the Vedavati river in the central part of the Indian state of Karnataka. Chitradurga is a place with historical significance and a major tourist hub of Karnataka. The city is renowned for its 15th century Kallina Kote or Stone Fortress. This is formed from two Kannada words: 'Kallina' means "Stone's" and Kote means "Fort". Other names used in Kannada are 'Ukkina Kote'": "Steel Fort" (metaphorically used to mean an impregnable fort) and 'Yelusuttina Kote': "Seven Circles Fort".

== Etymology ==
Chitradurga was also known by the names Chitradurg and Chittaldurg. Chittaldrug (or Chitaldrug or Chittledroog) was the official name used during the period of British rule.

== History ==
Chitradurga features bold rock hills and picturesque valleys, with huge towering boulders in numerous shapes. It is known as the "stone fortress" (Kallina Kote).

=== Legend ===
According to the epic Mahabharatha, a man-eating Rakshasa named Hidimba and his sister Hidimbi lived on the hill. Hidimba was a source of terror to everyone around, while Hidimbi was a peace-loving rakshasi. When the Pandavas came with their mother Kunti in the course of their exile, Bhima had a duel with Hidimba in which Hidimba was killed. Bhima married Hidimbi and they had a son named Ghatotkacha, who had magical powers. Legend has it the boulders were part of the arsenal used by Bhima during that duel. The boulders on which a major part of the city was developed belong to the oldest rock formation in the country.

Timmanna Nayaka, a chieftain under the Vijayanagar Empire, was appointed as governor of Chitradurga as a reward from the Vijayanagara ruler for his excellence in military services. This was the beginning of the rule of the Nayakas of Chitradurga. His son Obana Nayaka is known by the name Madakari Nayaka (1588 CE). (He was the last ruler of Chitradurga. His name comes from his ability to have suppressed the arrogance- "Mada" of a particular troublesome elephant- "Kari"). Madakari Nayaka's son Kasturi Rangappa (1602) succeeded him and consolidated the kingdom to rule peacefully. As he had no heirs to succeed him, his adopted son, the apparent heir, was enthroned. But he was killed a few months later by the Dalavayis.

Chikkanna Nayaka (1676), the brother of Madakari Nayaka II, served on the throne. His brother succeeded him in 1686 with the title Madakari Nayaka III. The Dalawayis overthrow of Madakari Nayaka III's rule gave an opportunity to one of their distant relatives, Bharamappa Nayaka, to ascend the throne in 1689. He is known as the greatest of the Nayaka rulers. The subjects of Chitradurga suffered through the brief reigns of the successive rulers, which resulted in volatile conditions. The Hiri Madakari Nayaka IV (1721), Kasturi Rangappa Nayaka II (1748), Madakari Nayaka V (1758) ruled this area.

The final ruler, Madakari Nayaka V (1758–1779) rule ended with fort siege by Hyder Ali. The city and fort came under the rule of Hyder Ali and his son, Tipu Sultan, and subsequently control of the Royal Mysore family after Tipu Sultan's defeat by the British.

=== Legend of Onake Obavva ===
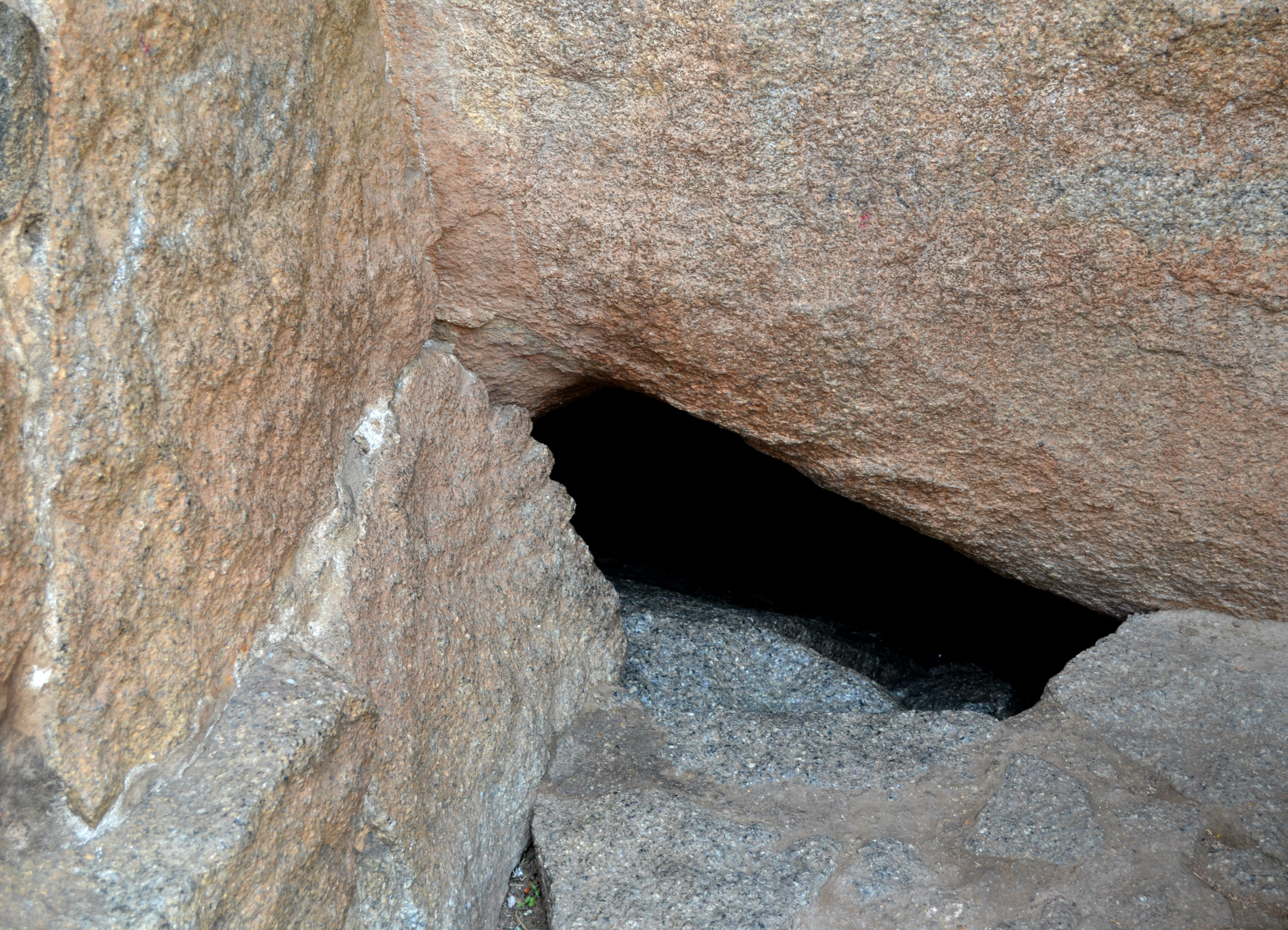
An opening in the rocks of Chitradurga fort that was used by Hyder Ali for an attempted invasion by his soldiers. This was defeated by Obavva.

During the reign of Chowdappa Nayaka and Bhadrappa Nayaka, the town of Chitradurga was besieged by troops of Hyder Ali . A chance sighting of a woman entering the Chitradurga fort through an opening in the rocks led to a clever plan by Hyder Ali to send his soldiers through the hole. The guard on duty near that hole had gone home for lunch. Obavva, the wife of that guard, was passing by the hole to collect water, when she noticed soldiers emerging into the fort. Obavva was carrying an Onake (a long wooden club meant for pounding paddy grains).

She killed Hyder Ali's soldiers one by one as they attempted to enter the fort through the opening and moved the dead. Over a short period of time, hundreds of soldiers entered and fell, without raising any suspicion. After returning from lunch, Obavva's husband was shocked to see Obavva standing with a blood-stained Onake and hundreds of dead enemy bodies around her. Together both wife and husband beat up most of the soldiers. But as both were about to finish off the soldiers, Obavva died.

The opening in the rocks remains as a historical marker for this account. The Tanniru doni, the well that Obavva was going to when she saw the invading soldiers, has also survived. Though Obavva saved the fort on that occasion, Madakari Nayaka could not repel another attack in 1779 by Hyder Ali. In the ensuing battle, the fort of Chitradurga fell to the invader. Obavva, like Keladi Chennamma, remains a legend, especially to the women of Karnataka.

== Geography ==
Chitradurga is located at 14.23°N 76.4°E. It has an average elevation of 732 metres (2401 ft).

Chitradurga city is well connected to Bengaluru, Mysore, Mangalore, Davanagere, Hubli, Hospet, Bellary, Shimoga, Tumkur, Bijapur, Belgaum by road and through railways.

=== Geology: National Geological Monument ===
What is known as "Pillow Lava" near the village of Maradihalli, Chitradurga District, Karnataka, has been designated as a National Geological Monument of India by the Geological Survey of India (GSI). They are protected and maintained to promote geotourism.

== Geography ==
=== Climate ===
The climate here is considered to be a local steppe climate. During the year, there is little rainfall in Chitradurga. The Köppen-Geiger climate classification is BSh. The temperature here averages 25.3 °C. The rainfall here averages 576 mm.

Climate data for Chitradurga (1991–2020, extremes 1901–2020)
Month	Jan	Feb	Mar	Apr	May	Jun	Jul	Aug	Sep	Oct	Nov	Dec	Year
Record high °C (°F)	34.1 (93.4)	37.9 (100.2)	39.7 (103.5)	41.0 (105.8)	41.7 (107.1)	39.2 (102.6)	34.4 (93.9)	34.1 (93.4)	35.0 (95.0)	35.0 (95.0)	33.6 (92.5)	33.5 (92.3)	41.7 (107.1)
Mean daily maximum °C (°F)	29.9 (85.8)	32.4 (90.3)	35.3 (95.5)	36.2 (97.2)	34.8 (94.6)	30.5 (86.9)	28.4 (83.1)	28.1 (82.6)	29.3 (84.7)	29.7 (85.5)	28.8 (83.8)	28.5 (83.3)	31.0 (87.8)
Daily mean °C (°F)	23.2 (73.8)	25.6 (78.1)	28.4 (83.1)	29.5 (85.1)	28.3 (82.9)	25.6 (78.1)	24.3 (75.7)	24.0 (75.2)	24.6 (76.3)	24.7 (76.5)	23.5 (74.3)	22.5 (72.5)	25.3 (77.6)
Mean daily minimum °C (°F)	16.7 (62.1)	18.8 (65.8)	21.4 (70.5)	22.7 (72.9)	22.5 (72.5)	21.7 (71.1)	21.1 (70.0)	20.7 (69.3)	20.6 (69.1)	20.1 (68.2)	18.3 (64.9)	16.5 (61.7)	20.1 (68.2)
Record low °C (°F)	8.5 (47.3)	11.2 (52.2)	14.4 (57.9)	16.4 (61.5)	17.4 (63.3)	17.2 (63.0)	17.8 (64.0)	17.8 (64.0)	15.0 (59.0)	13.9 (57.0)	8.3 (46.9)	9.2 (48.6)	8.3 (46.9)
Average rainfall mm (inches)	1.5 (0.06)	3.7 (0.15)	7.3 (0.29)	45.1 (1.78)	77.7 (3.06)	74.9 (2.95)	82.5 (3.25)	96.3 (3.79)	107.4 (4.23)	151.9 (5.98)	53.4 (2.10)	8.9 (0.35)	710.8 (27.98)
Average rainy days	0.2	0.4	0.6	2.9	4.5	5.5	8.6	8.8	6.6	7.6	2.7	0.8	49.3
Average relative humidity (%) (at 17:30 IST)	35	28	26	32	43	66	73	75	66	62	55	44	50
Source 1: India Meteorological Department
Source 2: Tokyo Climate Center (mean temperatures 1991–2020)

== Demographics ==
As of 2011 India census, Chitradurga had a population of 1,25,170. Males constitute 51% of the population and females 49%. Chitradurga has an average literacy rate of 76%, higher than the national average of 59.5%; with male literacy of 80% and female literacy of 72%. 11% of the population is under 6 years of age.

Religions in Chitradurga city (2011)
Religion	Percent
Hinduism	68.80%
Islam	29.01%
Christianity	0.69%
Other or not stated	1.49%

Languages of Chitradurga City
1. Kannada (61.8%)
2. Urdu (28.6%)
3. Telugu (5.08%)
4. Hindi (2.33%)
5. Others (2.26%)

== Administration ==
Chitradurga city is administered by the Chitradurga city municipal council.

== Renewable Energy ==
Chitradurga situated in a hilly region is also known to experience wind currents throughout the year making it a suitable place to set up wind mills and wind farms. There are several Wind-Power based power plants located around Chitradurga and most of the hills are embellished with wind mills which can be seen while entering the city. These wind farms have a total installed capacity of 49.7 MW.

== Historical places ==
=== Chitradurga Fort ===
Chitradurga Fort was built between the 10th and 18th centuries by the kings various dynasties during that period which are Rashtrakutas, Kalyana Chalukyas, Hoysalas, Vijayanagar and Nayakas of Chitradurga. After Hyder Ali illegally Captured the fort from the last ruler of Chitradurga Madakari Nayaka in the year 1779. It comprises a series of seven enclosure walls in Kannada. On the upper part of the fort Eighteen ancient temples can be found and in the lower part of the fort there is one huge temple. Among these temples the oldest and most interesting is the Hidambeshwara temple. The masjid was an addition during Hyder Ali's rule. The fort's many interconnecting tanks were used to harvest rainwater, and the fort was said to never suffer from a water shortage. This seemingly impregnable fort has 19 gateways, 38 posterior entrances, a palace, a mosque, granaries, oil pits, four secret entrances and water tanks. Murugha Mutt in Chitradurga, nearby to this place also has historical significance.

=== Chandravalli ===
The Chandravalli cave complex is found between the three hills of Chitradurga, Cholagudda, and Kirubanakallu. The cave complex includes stone steps which lead to underground passageways, rooms, and ante-rooms dating from the Kadamba, Satavahana, and Hoysala era, as well as temples for the meditation of sages from the Ankali Math of Belgaum. Although the underground rooms are provided with ventilation, they have no natural lighting, making them suitable places of refuge during an impending attack on the region.

== Gallery ==
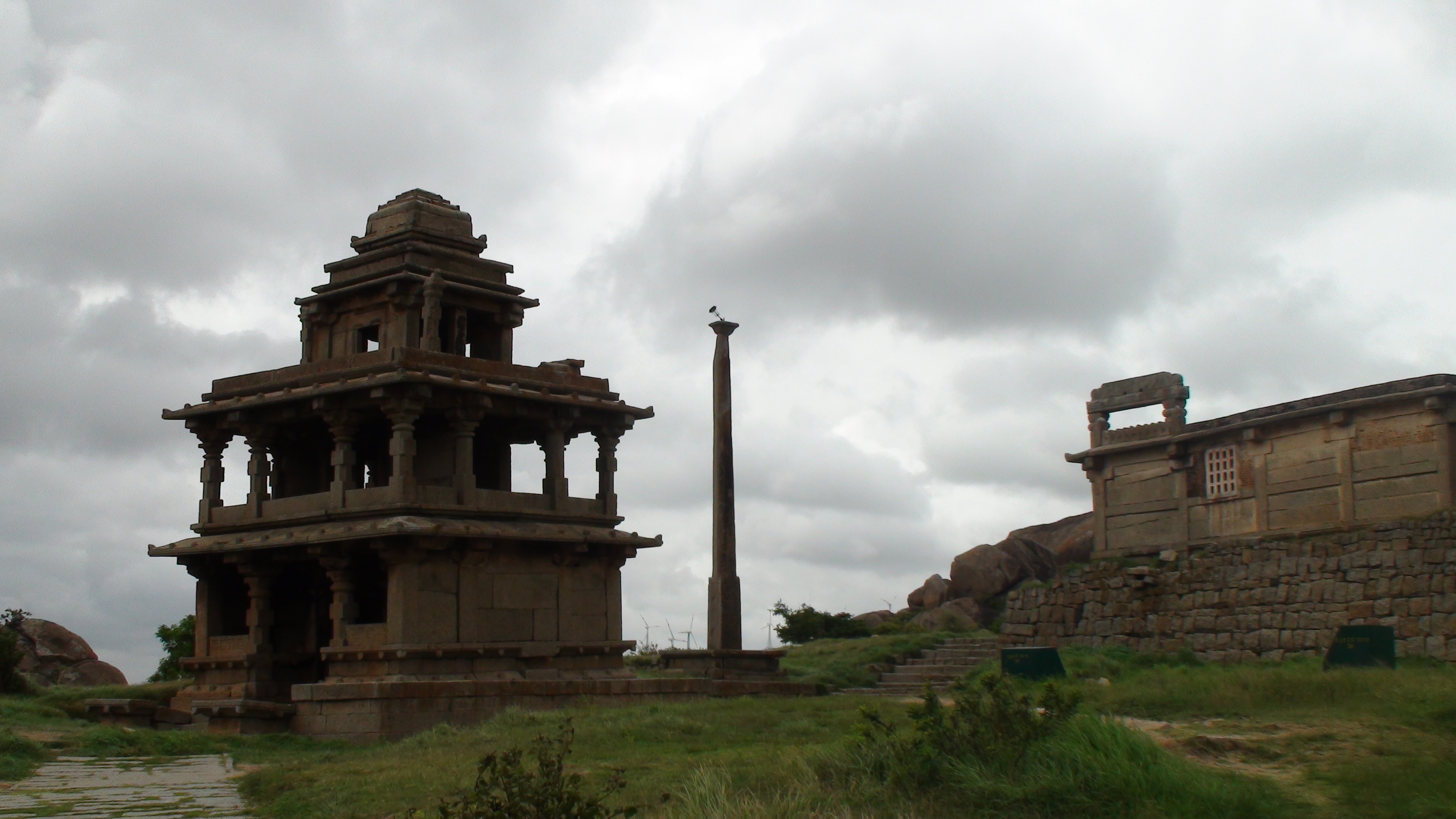
Gaali mantapa

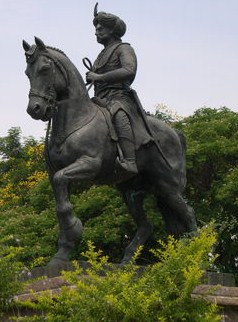
Madakari Nayaka statue

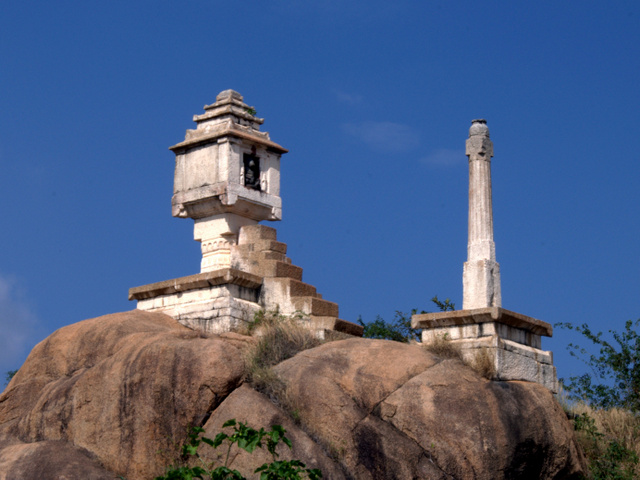
Nandi

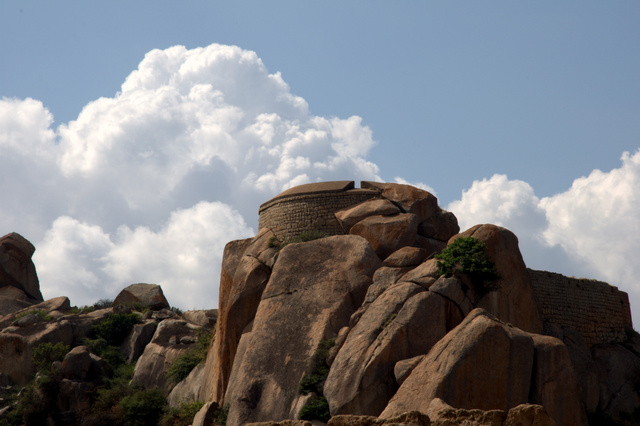
Fort

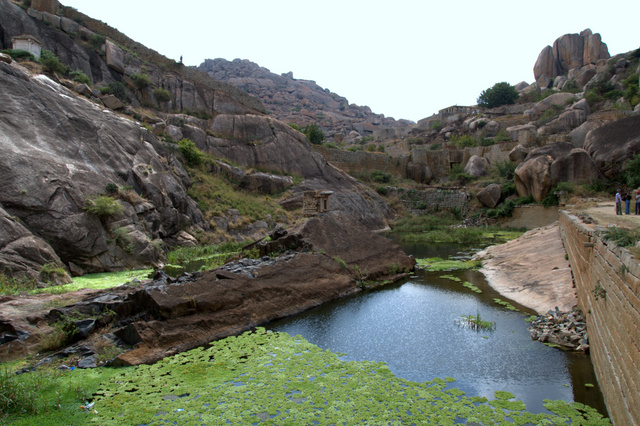
Pond View

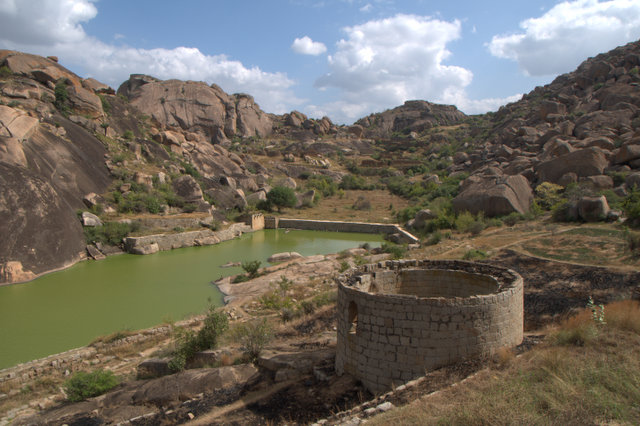
Inside View of Fort

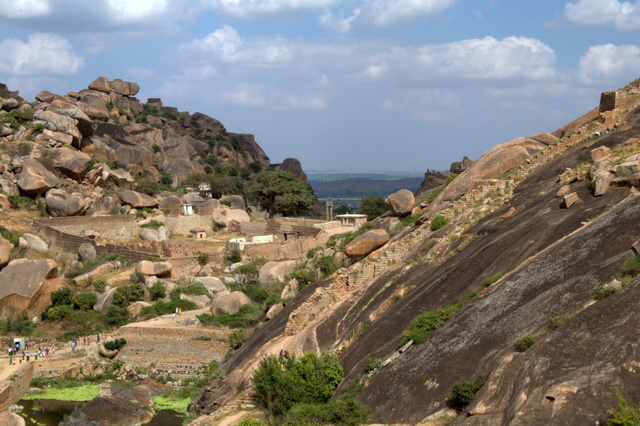
Another view of Fort

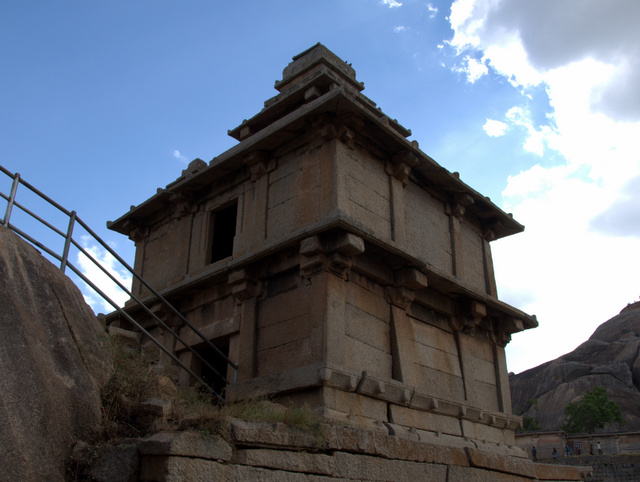
Gopura

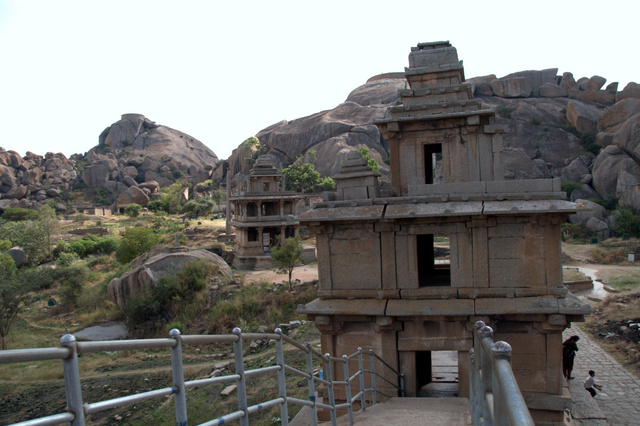
Temples inside the fort

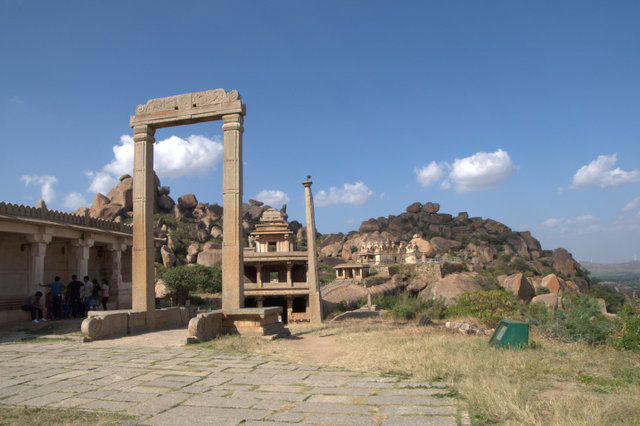
Stone Pillars

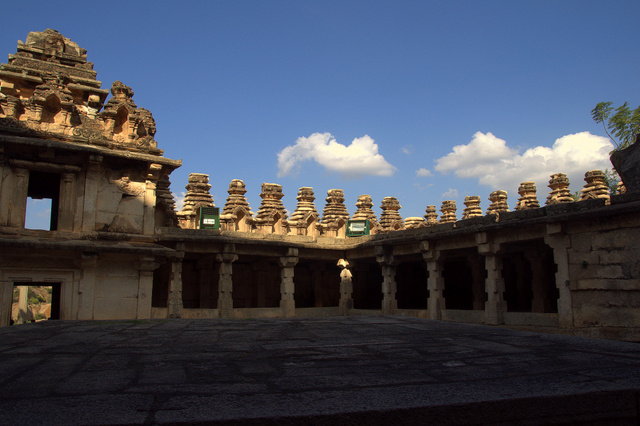
Sampige Siddalingeshwara Temple

== See also ==
- Ajjappanahalli, Chitradurga
