= Chitradurga Fort =

Fort in Karnataka, India

- Karnataka, India
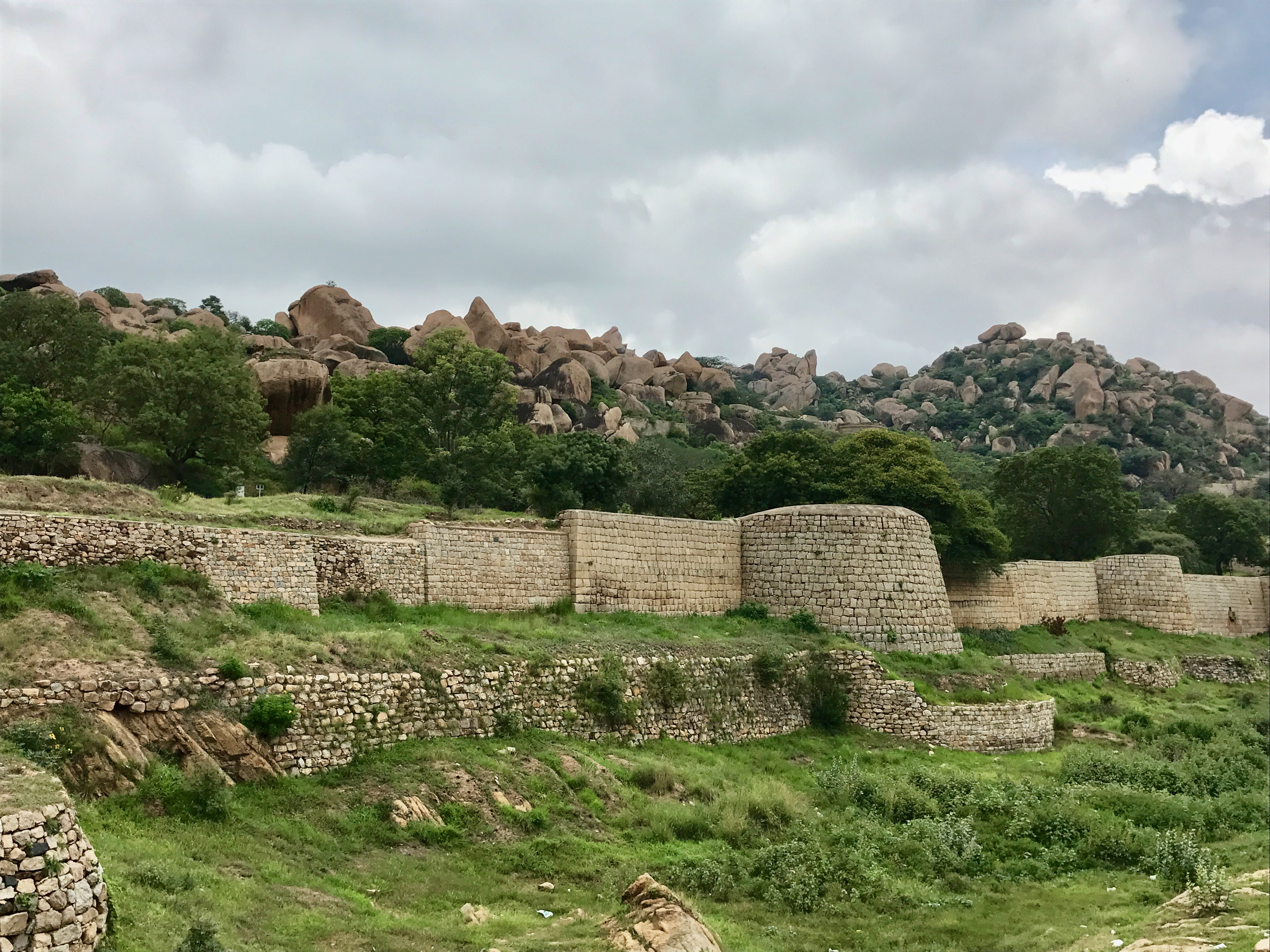
- One of the seven layers of Chitradurga fort

Site information
- Type: Fort
- Controlled by: Government of Karnataka
- Open to the public: Yes

Location
- Location within India Location within Karnataka
- Coordinates: 14.2152°N 76.3953°E

Site history
- Built: 13-16th century
- Built by: Chalukyas
- Materials: Granite stones
- Battles/wars: Nayakas against Hyder Ali in 1760s, 1770s and 1799

Chitradurga Fort, or as the British called it Chitaldoorg, is a fortification that straddles several hills and a peak overlooking a flat valley in the Chitradurga District, Karnataka, India. The fort's name Chitrakaldurga, which means 'picturesque fort' in Kannada, is the namesake of the town Chitradurga and its administrative district.

The fort was built in stages between the 11th and 13th centuries by the dynastic rulers of the region, including the Chalukyas and Hoysalas, later the Nayakas of Chitradurga of the Vijayanagar Empire. The Nayakas of Chitradurga, or Palegar Nayakas, were most responsible for the expansion of the fort between the 15th and 18th centuries. The fort was taken over for a short while by Hyder Ali at Chitradurga in 1779. The fort was captured by the British forces twenty years later, when they defeated his son Tipu Sultan. The fort is built in a series of seven concentric fortification walls with various passages, a citadel, masjid, warehouses for grains and oil, water reservoirs and ancient temples. There are 18 temples in the upper fort and one huge temple in the lower fort. Among these temples, the oldest and most interesting is the Hidimbeshwara temple. The masjid was an addition during Hyder Ali's rule.

== Geography ==
Chitradurga Fort lies in the midst of a valley formed by the Vedavati River. The Tungabhadra River flows to the northwest of the fort. Seven hills constitute the Chinmuladri range. The seven circles of the fort enclose these hills. Features of massive rock hills and scenic valleys, huge towering boulders are seen in the fort precincts. The hills on which the major part of the fort and the city rest belong to the oldest rock of granitic formation in the country. The highest hill peak of the area is located at Jogi Matti, 5 kilometres (3.1 mi) to the south of Chitradurga. The highest elevation of the hills at the fort is 976 metres (3,202 ft). The area covered by the fort is reported to be 1,500 acres (607.0 ha).

The fort is located 120 km (74.6 mi) from Hampi, the UNESCO World Heritage Site and 200 km (124.3 mi) from Bangalore. Chitradurga railway line is connected to main line at ChikkajajurBangalore/Mysore – Arasikere broad gauge railway line.

== History ==
A number of inscriptions of the Chalukyas, the Hoysalas and the Vijayanagar kings have been found in and around the fort. These inscriptions traces the history of the fort to the Ashokan period rock edicts found near Brahmagiri also link Chitradurga to the Mauryan Empire during the reign of the royal dynasties of Rashtrakutas, Chalukyas and Hoysalas. However, the area where the fort now exists achieved prominence only under the dynastic rule of the Nayakas of Chitradurga or "Paleygars" (called "little kings") as a feudatory of the Vijayanagar Empire.

Between 1500 AD and 1800 AD, Chitradurga Fort witnessed a turbulent history starting with the Vijayanagar Empire; the empire had gained control of this region from the Hoysalas. Vijayanagar rulers brought the Nayakas, the traditional local chieftains of the area, under their control as their feudatory until their dynastic reign ended in 1565 A.D. Thereafter, the Nayakas of Chitradurga took independent control of the region, and their clan ruled for more than 200 years until the last of their rulers, Madakari Nayaka V, was defeated by Hyder Ali of Mysore Kingdom, in 1779. During all these years, Chitradurga Fort was central to the reign, particularly of the Nayakas.

Timmanna Nayaka or Thimmappa Nayaka, a chieftain from Matti during the rule of Saluva Narasimha Deva Raya, was the first ruler in the hierarchy of the Nayakas of Chitradurga. Initially, he was a chieftain under the Vijayanagar Empire. Still, he was soon elevated to the rank of Governor of Chitradurga by the Vijayanagar ruler in recognition of his excellent military service to the empire. He controlled areas of the Chitradurga District including Davangere, Jaglur and Harihar in the present Davangere District. His rule lasted for a brief period and ended with his incarceration and death as a prisoner of the Vijaynagar Empire. His son Obana Nayaka or Madakari Nayaka I (1588–1602) succeeded him. Followed by a series of hierarchical or other adopted forms of successions of the same clan. Bharamappa Nayaka, who ruled from 1689 until 1722, is regarded as the greatest of the Nayaka rulers famed for building forts, palaces, tanks, and temples, including several gateways and bastions. He fought several battles against the Mughals.

Madakari Nayaka V was the final ruler of the clan from 1758 to 1779. During his reign, the city of Chitradurga and the fort were besieged by the troops of Hyder Ali. Madakari Nayaka used the fort effectively for defense during three battles against Hyder Ali, at times allying himself with Hyder Ali of Mysore Kingdom and at others with the Marathas. Hyder Ali attacked the Chitradurga Fort the first time in 1760, the second time in 1770, and the third time successfully in 1779 when he defeated Madakari Nayaka. Nayaka was taken prisoner and killed. Nayaka's gamble of playing with Hyder Ali and the Marathas was unsuccessful; he was betrayed by the Marathas and some local Muhammadan officers in his service. Subsequent to his death, the treasury at the fort is said to have yielded a rich bounty. During one such war, the heroics of Onake Obavva, the wife of a soldier guarding the fort, became a legendary event.

The dynastic reign of the Nayakas lasted for over 200 years, and the Chitradurga fort was their stronghold and the very heart of their province.

In the Fourth Mysore War, Tippu Sultan was killed by the British in 1799, and the Mysore Kingdom was reordered under the Wodeyars. Chitradurga became a part of Mysore province. The British considered Chitradurga Fort a potentially useful base for providing a strong line of defense to Mysore's northern border. Between 1799 and 1809, the British garrisoned their troops in the fort. Later, the control of the fort was restored to the Government of Mysore.

== Legend ==
Folk legend links the hills surrounding the fort to the epic Mahabharata. It is said that a man-eating giant named Hidimbasura lived on the Chitradurga hill and had terrorized everyone around. When the Pandavas came with their mother Kunti in the course of their exile, Bhima had a duel with Hidimba. Hidimba was slain by Bhima, and peace returned to the area. Legend further states that the boulders were part of the arsenal used during that duel.

== Fort precincts ==
Formidable Chitradurg Fort – views from the north and the east
North view of the hill fort of Chitradurga	East view of the hill fort of Chitradurga

The Nayak Palegars built the fort as an impregnable fortification for defense purposes with 19 gateways, 38 posterior entrances, 35 secret entrances, four invisible passages, water tanks and 2000 watch towers to guard and keep a vigil on the enemy incursions. The storage warehouses, pits, and reservoirs were primarily designed to ensure the food, water and military supplies required to endure a long siege. Uniquely, all these facilities are still well conserved. Seven walls (called Yelusuttinakote in local language) form the fort. Each wall has a gate with ascending access through winding narrow corridors, which would make it difficult to use elephants for attacking the fort or to use "battering rams" to break down the gates. Small embrasures in the fort walls were provided for use by archers to shoot arrows at the enemy. Four gates were provided in the outermost walls. The four gates (called Bagilu in Kannada) are Rangayyana Bagilu, Siddayyana Bagilu, Ucchangi Bagilu, and Lalkote Bagilu. Among the elaborate gateways, the gateway to the east of the fort has architectural features typical of the Bahmani Sultanate. Depending on the topography and the geological strata of the land, the fort walls were built with the height ranging from 5–13 metres (16–43 ft). Initially, it was built in mud but was subsequently strengthened in stretches with granite stone slabs in the 18th century. An outstanding feature noticed in several stretches of the fort walls is that no cementing material was used in joining the large granite cubes that have been neatly sized, cut, trimmed and placed in position. The total length of the fort walls is about 8 kilometres (5.0 mi) and covers an area of about 1,500 acres (610 ha). It is also said that when the upper fort was strengthened for military purposes with gun positions, the services of French mercenaries were used. The massive 'Palace of Stones' fort contained many buildings and many temples set in the rocky surroundings on the hill. Madakari Nayaka V, the last ruler of the Nayakas of Chitradurga, utilized the fort successfully for defense until he was defeated by Hyder Ali in 1779. The fort thus stands as a tribute to the Nayakas who ruled this part of Karnataka.

Subsequent additions to the forts were built with burnt bricks, set in mortar, plastered by a thin layer of cement or lime, and painted. However, the fort now shows deterioration. The mud-brick walls of the storehouses and granaries at the fort are getting eroded due to monsoon rains.

=== Temples in the fort ===
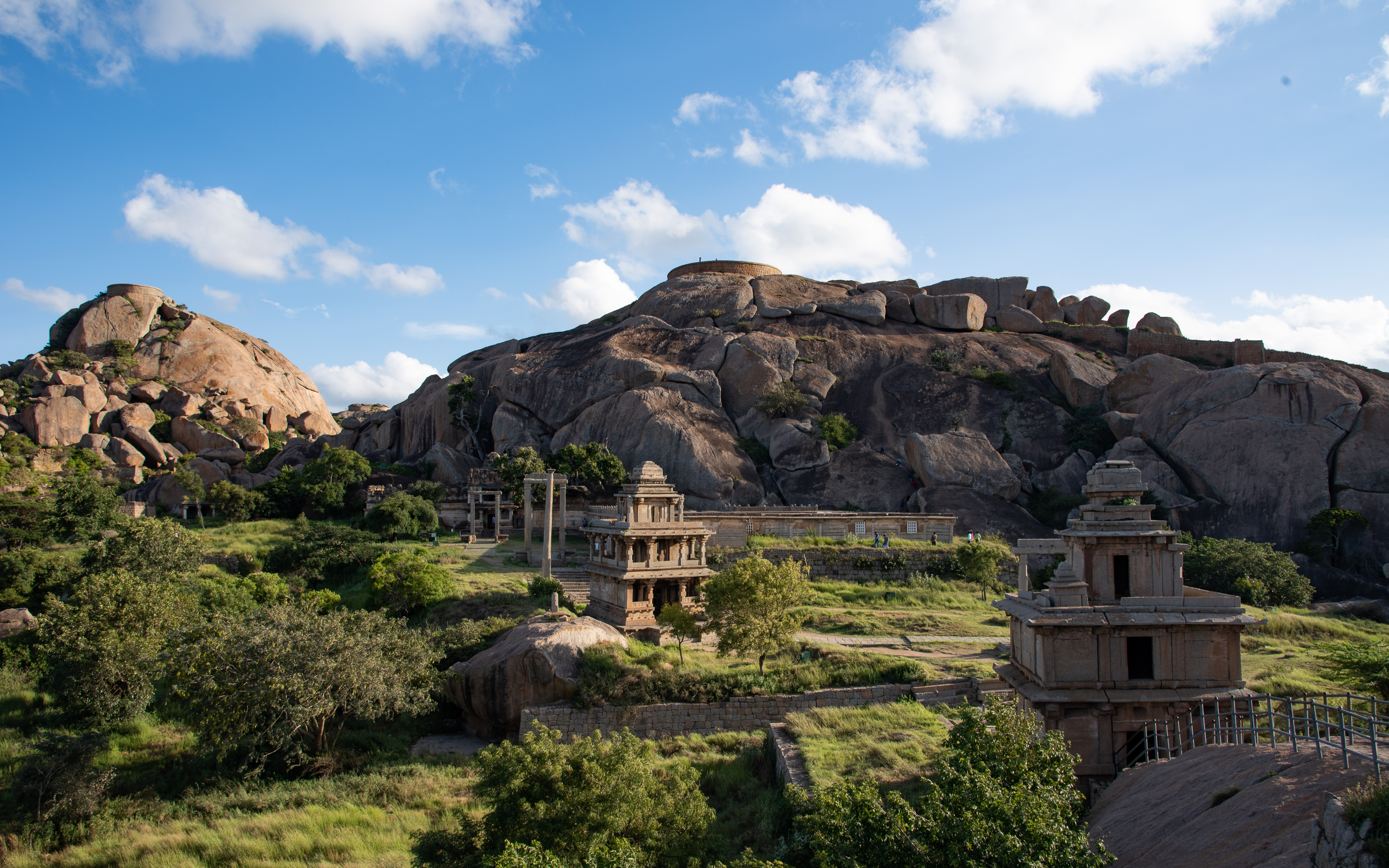
Chitradurga Fort Siddeshwara Temple

Eighteen temples were built in the upper fort. The presiding family deity of the Nayakas of Chitradurga was Goddess Ekanatheswari, an incarnation of Adi Parashakti. Ekanatheswari's footprints are sculpted into a block of stones at the entrance of the fort. Some of the well-known temples were the Hidimbeswara (an ancient legend is linked to it), Sampige Siddeshwara, Ekanathamma, Phalguneshwara, Gopala Krishna, Lord Hanuman, Subbaraya and Nandi.

Hidimbeswara temple displays the tooth of Hidimba, the giant (Rakshasa in Sanskrit). It is said that Hidimba and his sister Hidimbi, a giantess, used to live in this temple. Hidimbi, who fell in love with Bhima (the second of the Pandava brothers of Mahabharata), married him and had a child named Ghatotkacha. A large cylinder about 3 metres (9.8 ft) in circumference and 2 metres (6.6 ft) high made of iron plates known as Bheri or Drum of Bheema is also located here. A monolithic pillar and two swing frames are also seen at the gate to this temple. Sampige Siddheshvara temple is at the foot of the hill. In the Gopalakrishna Temple, inscriptions date the idol to the early 14th century.

The Murugarajendra Matha, a famous religious institution of the Lingayats, which was originally located within the fort, is now situated about 2 kilometres (1.2 mi) to the northwest of Chitradurga.

=== Other structures ===
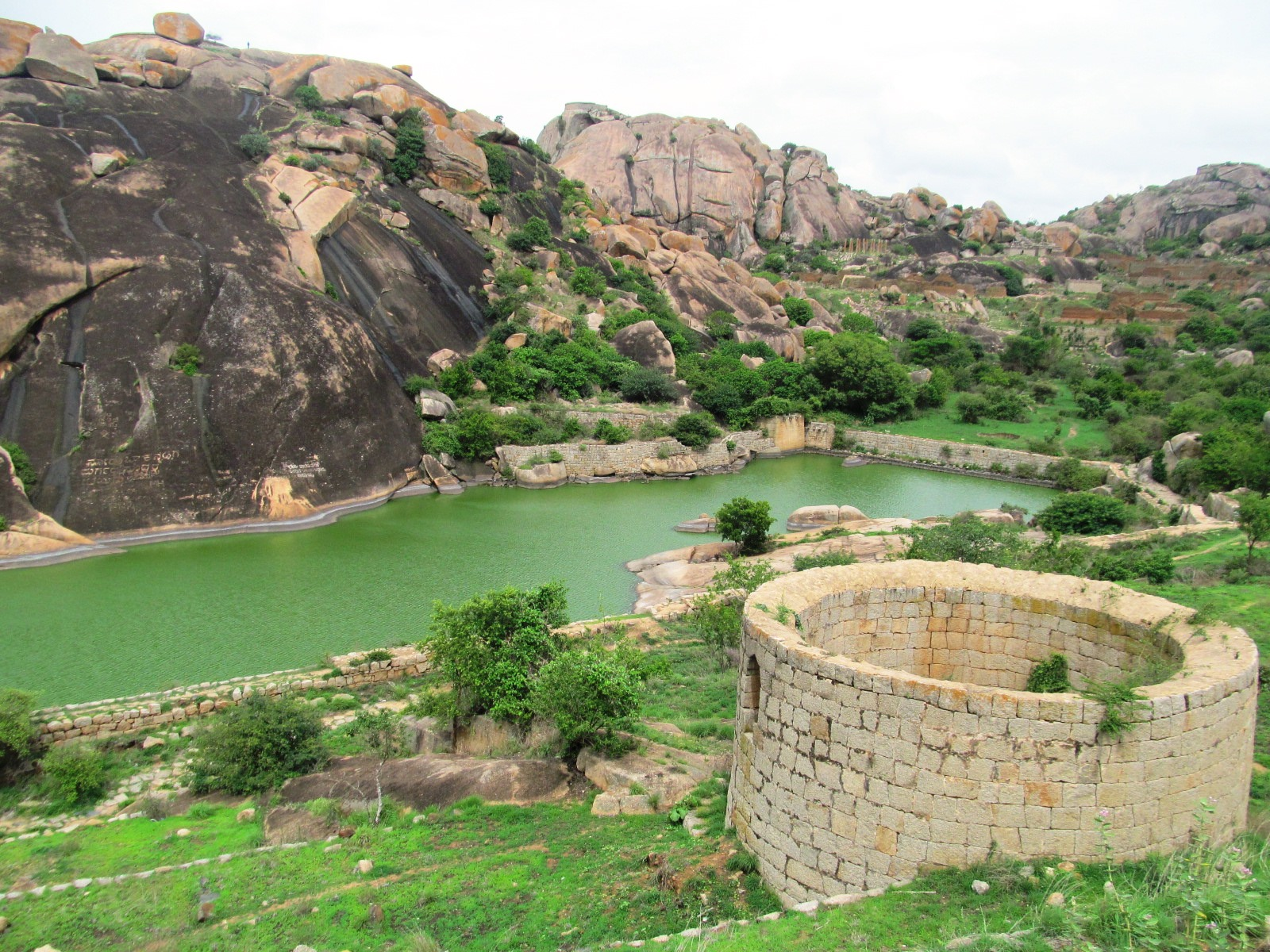
One of the tanks in the fort

Rainwater-harvesting structures were built in a cascade development, which ensured large storage of water in interconnected reservoirs. It is said that the fort precincts never faced any water shortage.

== Feature films ==
Several Kannada language feature films have been produced, keeping the historicity of this fort in view. Nagara Havu (Cobra) and Hamse Geete (Swan Song) are the most famous films produced in the locale of the fort. Another film reportedly under production is Veera Madakari Nayaka, about the last ruler of the Nayaka kingdom.

== Tourism ==
The fort is managed by Archeological Survey of India. It is open from dawn to dusk. Visitors are required to buy entrance tickets at the ticket counter and then explore the fort.

Few guides are available at the entrance of the fort. Exploring the fort requires climbing. The fort is not disabled-friendly. The best time to explore the fort is in the morning when the temperature is comfortable.

A hotel managed by Karnataka State Tourism Development Corporation is located near the main entrance. The fort is located at a distance of about 180 kilometers from Bengaluru.

== Gallery ==
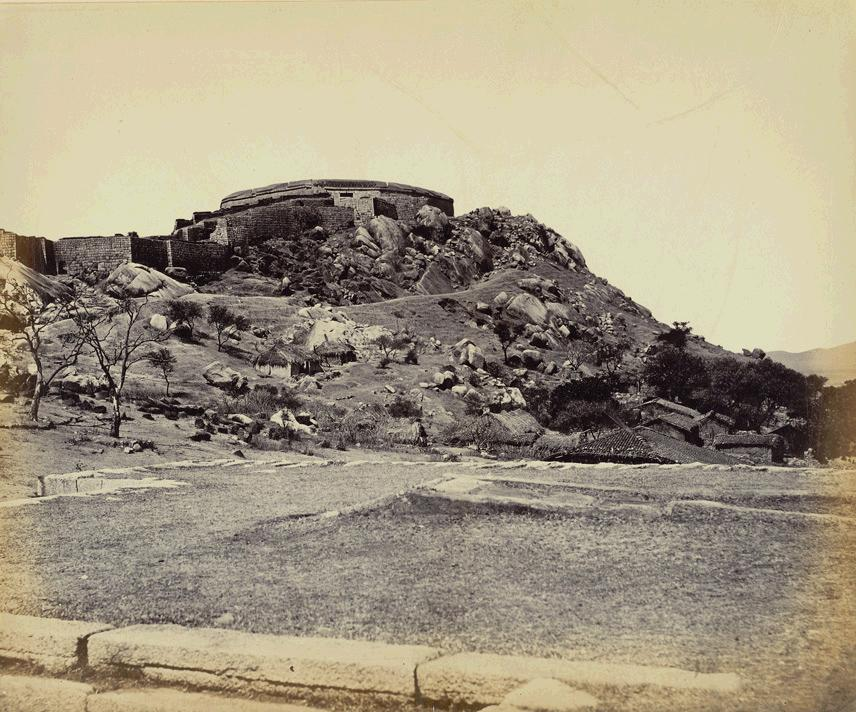
Inner citadel of the Chitradurga Fort

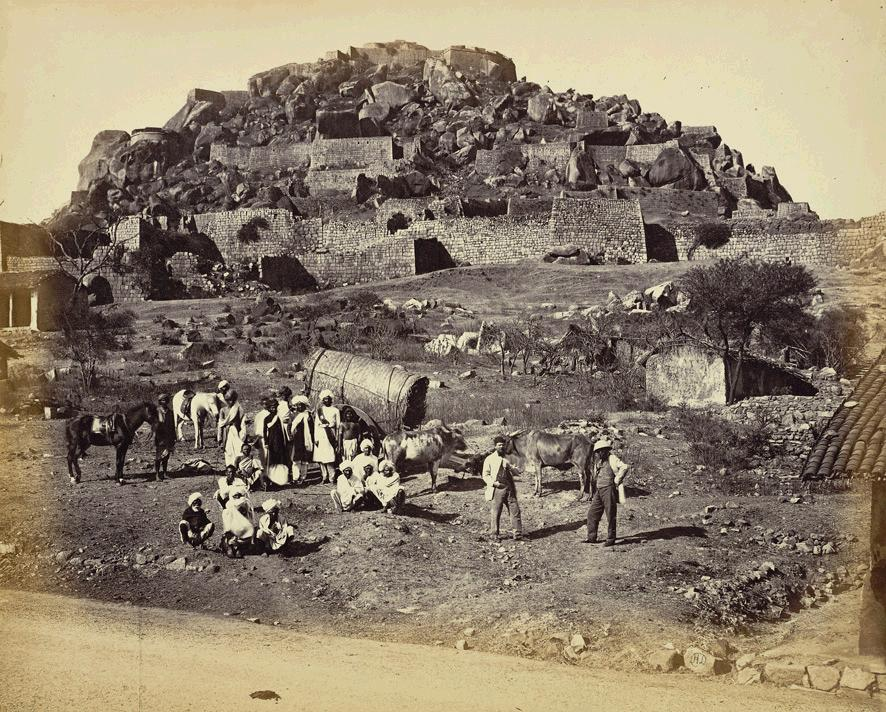
General view inside Fort, with Europeans and party posed in the foreground, Chitradurga

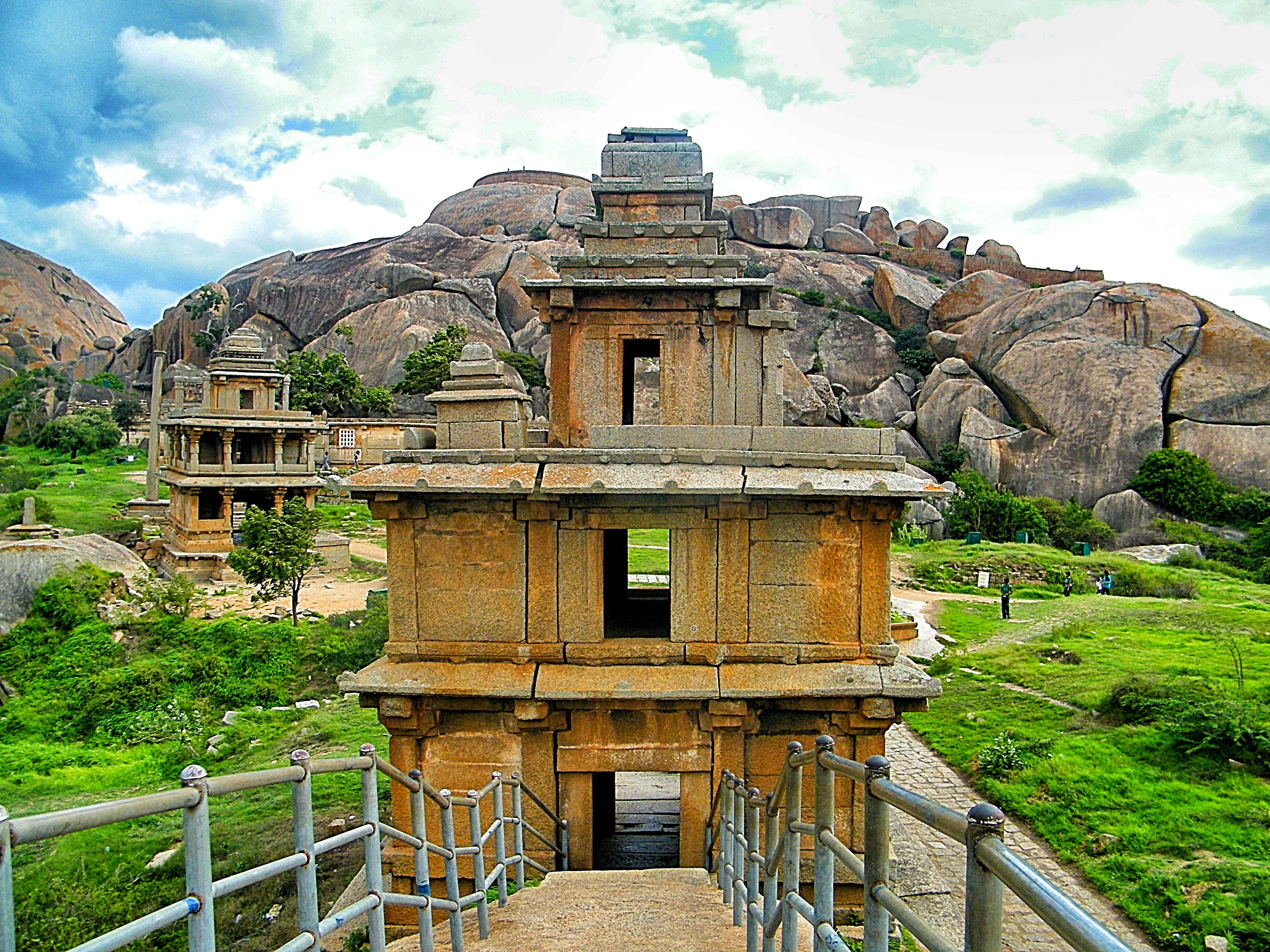
A temple ruin, Chitradurga.

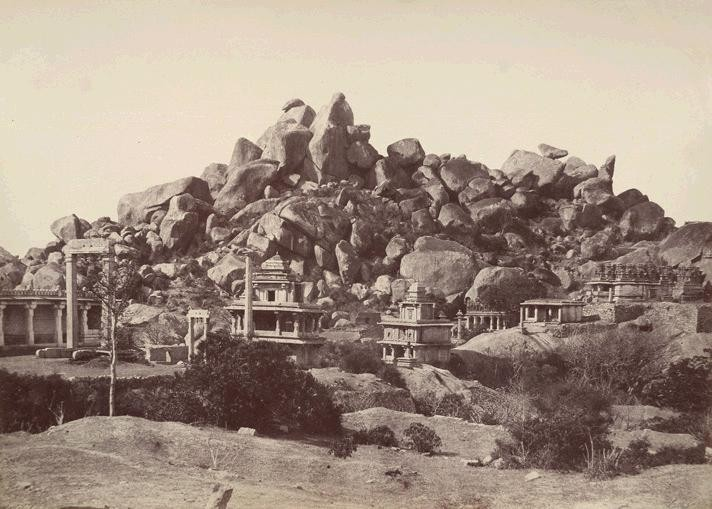
Temples of Chamondee and Hidambeswara

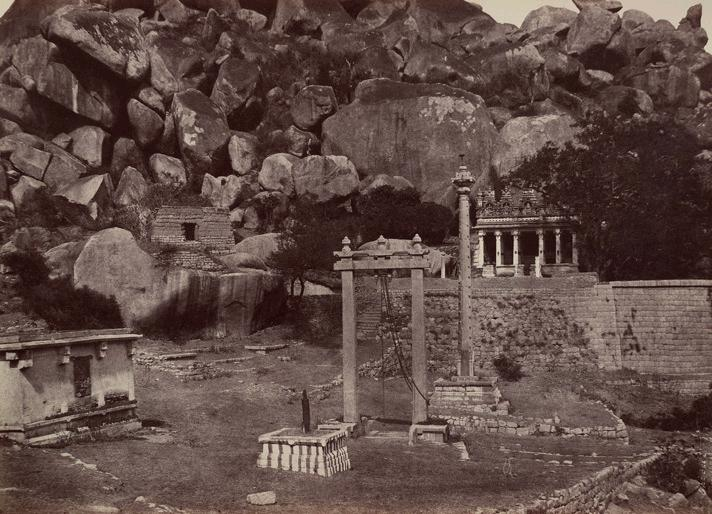
Pillar, and swing in the court of the Hidambeshwara and Chamundi Temples, Chitradurga

Wall of the fort, near the entrance

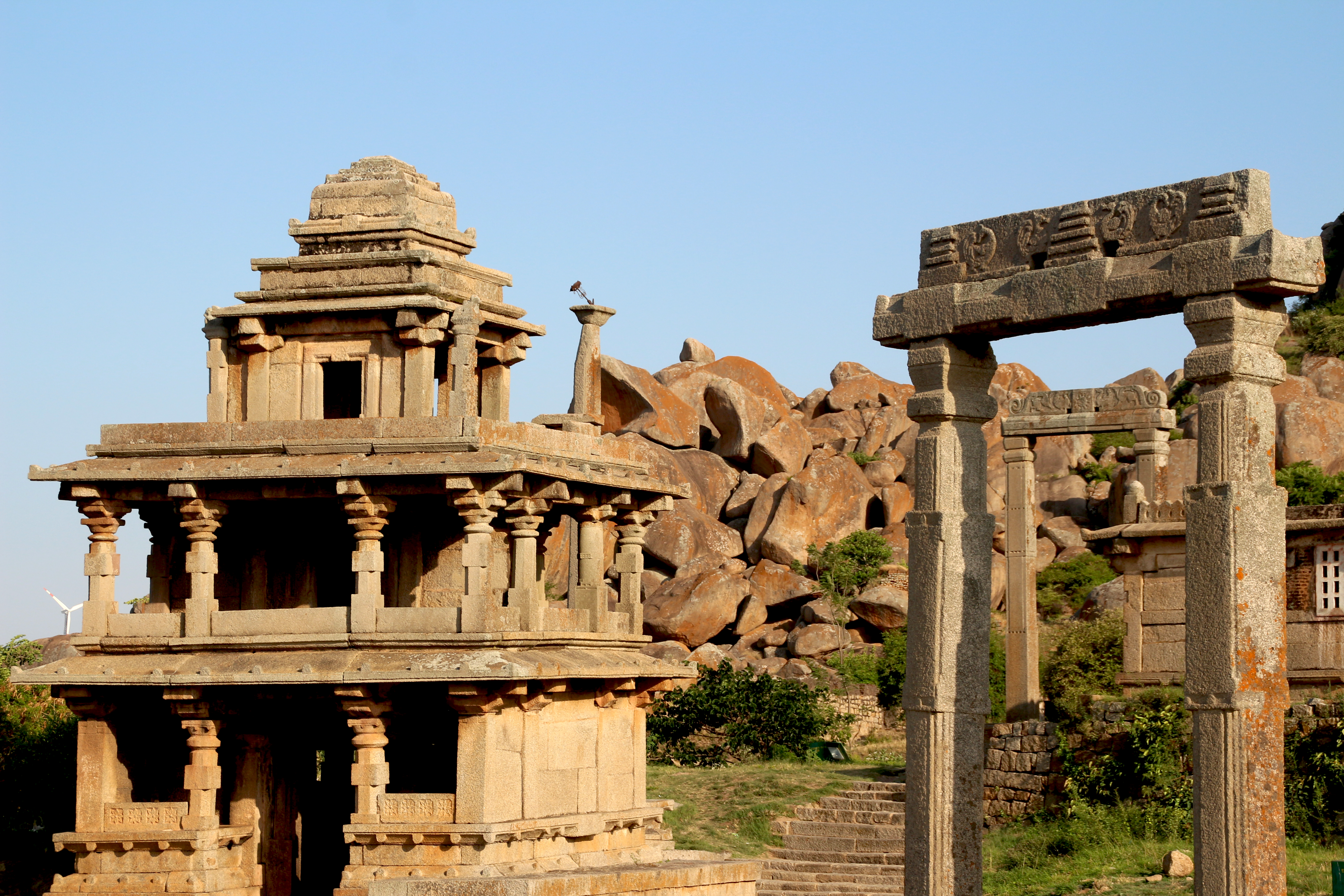
Ruins of temples and mandapa within the fort

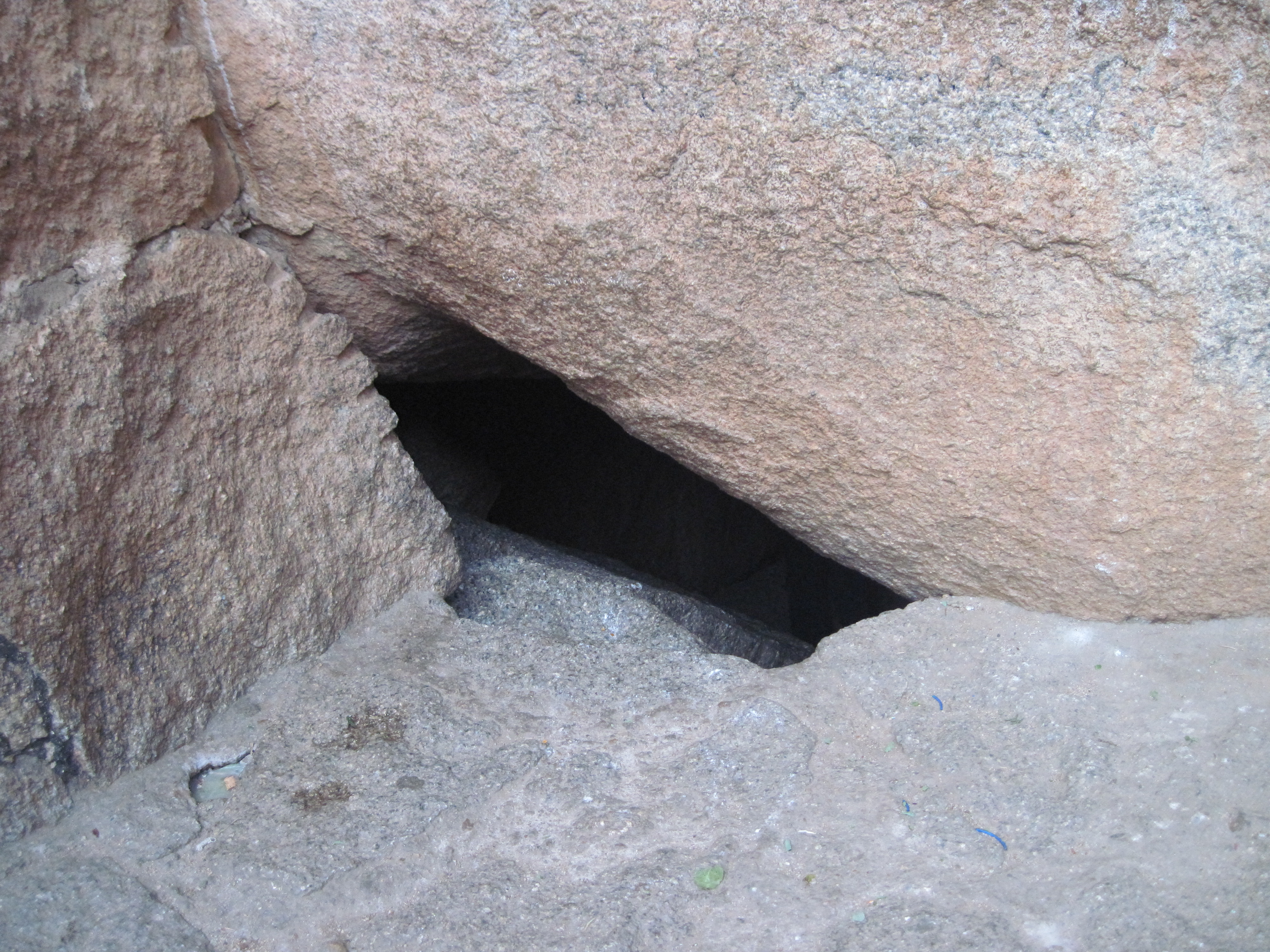
Onake Obavvana Kindi

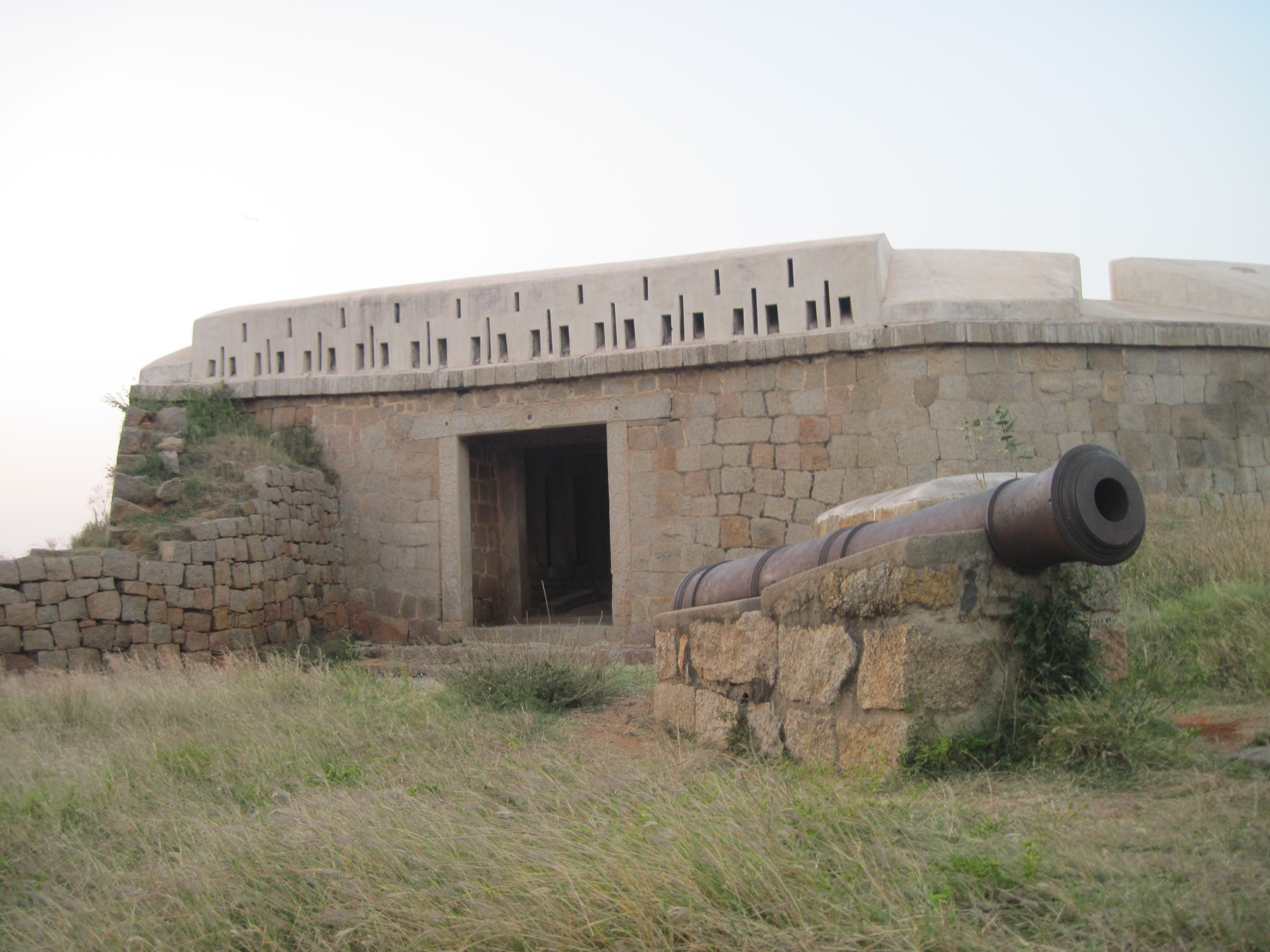
Bandikhane (jail)
