= Nayakas of Chitradurga =

Indian Ruling Dynasty

Chitradurga Nayaka Kingdom
- 1588–1779
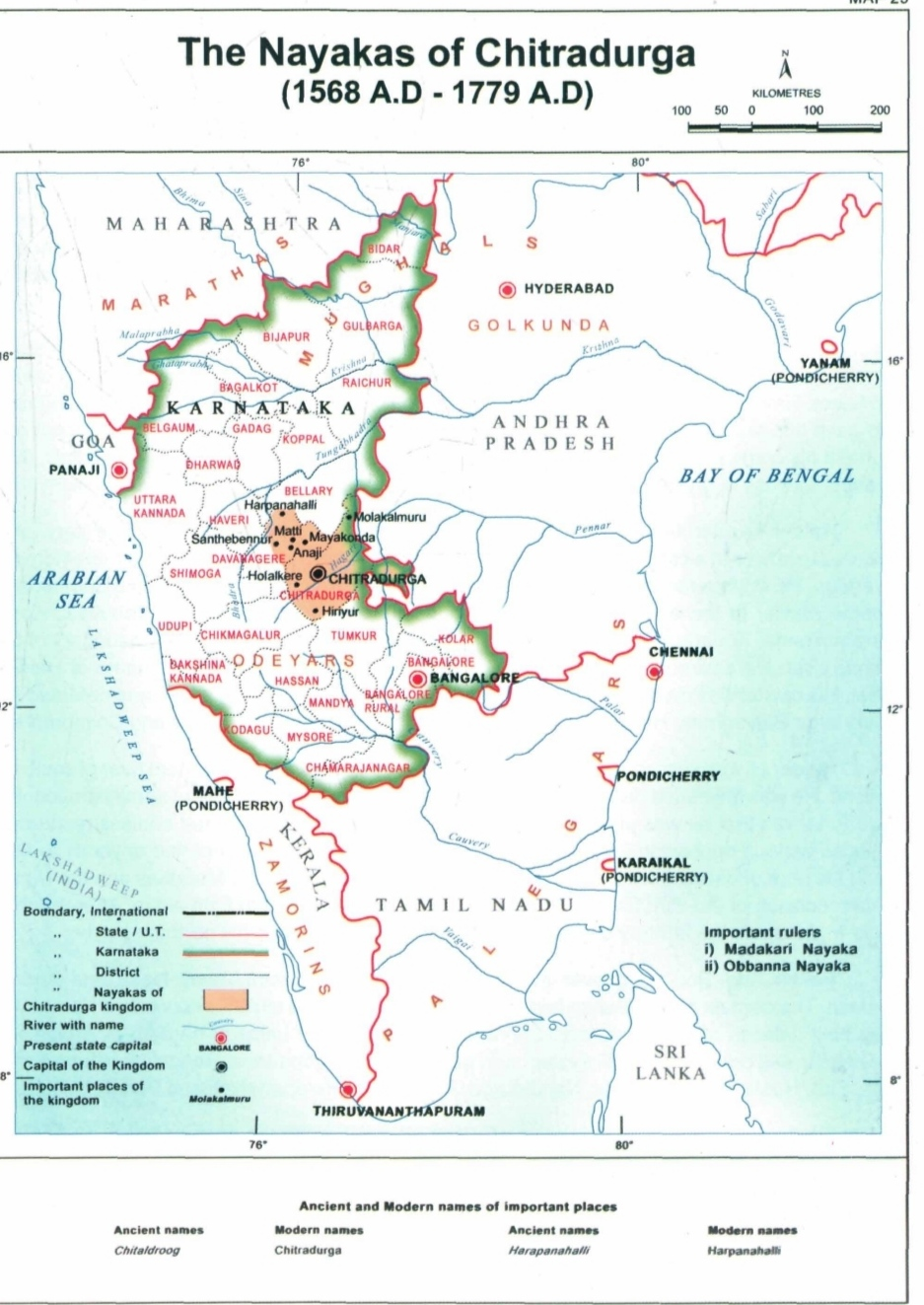
- Map Showing territories of Nayakas of Chitradurga Kingdom
- Status: Kingdom
- Capital: Chitradurga
- Official languages: Kannada
- Religion: Hinduism
- Government: Monarchy
- Historical era: Early modern
  - Established: 1588
  - Disestablished: 1779
Preceded by	Succeeded by
Vijayanagara Empire	Kingdom of Mysore
- Today part of: India

Nayakas of Chitradurga (1588–1779) were an Indian dynasty that ruled parts of eastern Karnataka during the post-Vijayanagara period, centered at Chitradurga. During the rule of the Hoysala Empire and the Vijayanagara Empire, they served as a feudatory chiefdom. Later, after the fall of the Vijayanagara Empire, they ruled at times as an independent chiefdom and at other times as a vassal of the Mysore Kingdom, Mughal Empire and Maratha Empire. Their territories merged into the Kingdom of Mysore under British rule.

== Origin ==
According to historian Barry Lewis, the earliest chieftains of the kingdom were local chiefs (Dandanayakas) of the Bedar caste under the Hoysala empire, during their rule over what is today Karnataka. They later won the attention and appreciation of the Vijayanagar kings through their acts of bravery and were appointed as governors of the region. According to historian Suryanath Kamath, the Chitradurga chiefs under the Vijayanagara empire were originally from the Davangere district in Karnataka. Some Marathi records call them Kala Pyada in admiration for their fighting qualities.

The Chitradurga Fort was their stronghold and the very heart of the province.

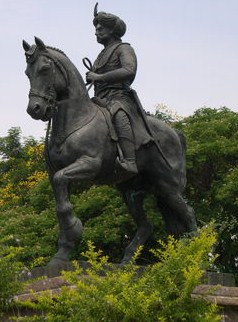
Statue of chief Madakari Nayaka

== The Nayaka clan ==
The Nayakas played a crucial role in the administration and military structure of the Vijayanagara Empire. The first of many figures was Timmanna Nayaka of Matti (also known as Thimmappa), who served under Saluva Narasimha. He governed regions corresponding to the present-day Davangere and Chitradurga districts. His career ended around 1588, when he died while in the custody of Vijayanagara authorities.

Timmanna’s son, Obanna Nayaka (also known as Madakari Nayaka I), ruled from 1588 to 1602. Upon his death, his son Kasturi Rangappa Nayaka I ascended the throne. Between 1602 and 1652, Kasturi Rangappa expanded the principality by capturing territories like Mayakonda, Santebennur, Holalkere, Anaji, and Jagalur from neighboring chiefs, largely in conflict with the sultanate of Bijapur. By the end of his reign, Chitradurga had grown wealthy, yielding approximately 65,000 Durgi pagodas in revenue.

His son, Madakari Nayaka II (1652–1674), continued this military tradition, consolidating power east of Chitradurga and achieving a notable victory in 1671 over Shah Adib Allah near the fort. However, the subsequent brief reigns of Obanna Nayaka II (1674–1675) and Shoora Kantha Nayaka (1675–1676) were marked by instability and internal violence; as both rulers were assassinated by their own chiefs. They were succeeded by Chikkanna Nayaka (1676–1686), Madakari Nayaka III (1686–1688), and Donne Rangappa Nayaka (1688–1689).

From 1689 to 1721, Bharamappa Nayaka of Bilichodu rose to prominence. He earned renown as a formidable warrior, allying with the Marathas in the Battle of Dodderi (1695), resisting Mughal incursions, and commissioning several temples and irrigation works; including Ranganatha Swamy at Niratadi. His contributions earned him the epithet Bichchugatti Bahramanna Nayaka, marking him as one of the most accomplished Nayaka rulers. His successor, Madakari Nayaka IV (1721–1748), continued Maratha affiliations but ultimately fell in conflict with rival Nayaka chiefs of Davangere. Kasturi Rangappa Nayaka II (1748–1754), a Maratha-supported ruler, briefly restored territories such as Mayakonda and Budihal with strategic support from Maratha Sardar Murari Rao and the Subedar of Sira. He died without an heir in 1754.

The final sovereign was Madakari Nayaka V (1758–1779), son of Bharamappa Nayaka of Janakallidurga. Ascending the throne as a minor, he matured into a skilled administrator and valiant warrior. His political acumen lay in switching allegiances between Hyder Ali’s Mysore and the Marathas as circumstances dictated. During his reign, Chitradurga Fort endured a prolonged siege by Hyder Ali in 1760, 1770, and finally in 1779. Amid the 1779 conflict, local folklore credits Onake Obavva, the wife of a fort guard, with repelling enemy soldiers by using a pestle at a secret tunnel entry; an act celebrated in Kannada legend.

Sharp political manoeuvring could not prevent Madakari’s downfall. Hyder Ali captured and imprisoned him in Srirangapatna, where he died in captivity in 1779. The victory also cost Chitradurga dearly: thousands of followers were reportedly taken prisoner and forcibly conscripted . Thus, the Nayaka lineage, which had held sway for over two centuries, effectively ended with Madakari’s defeat and death.
