= Ranganathaswamy Temple, Nirthadi =

Ranganatha Swamy Temple
- Hindu temple
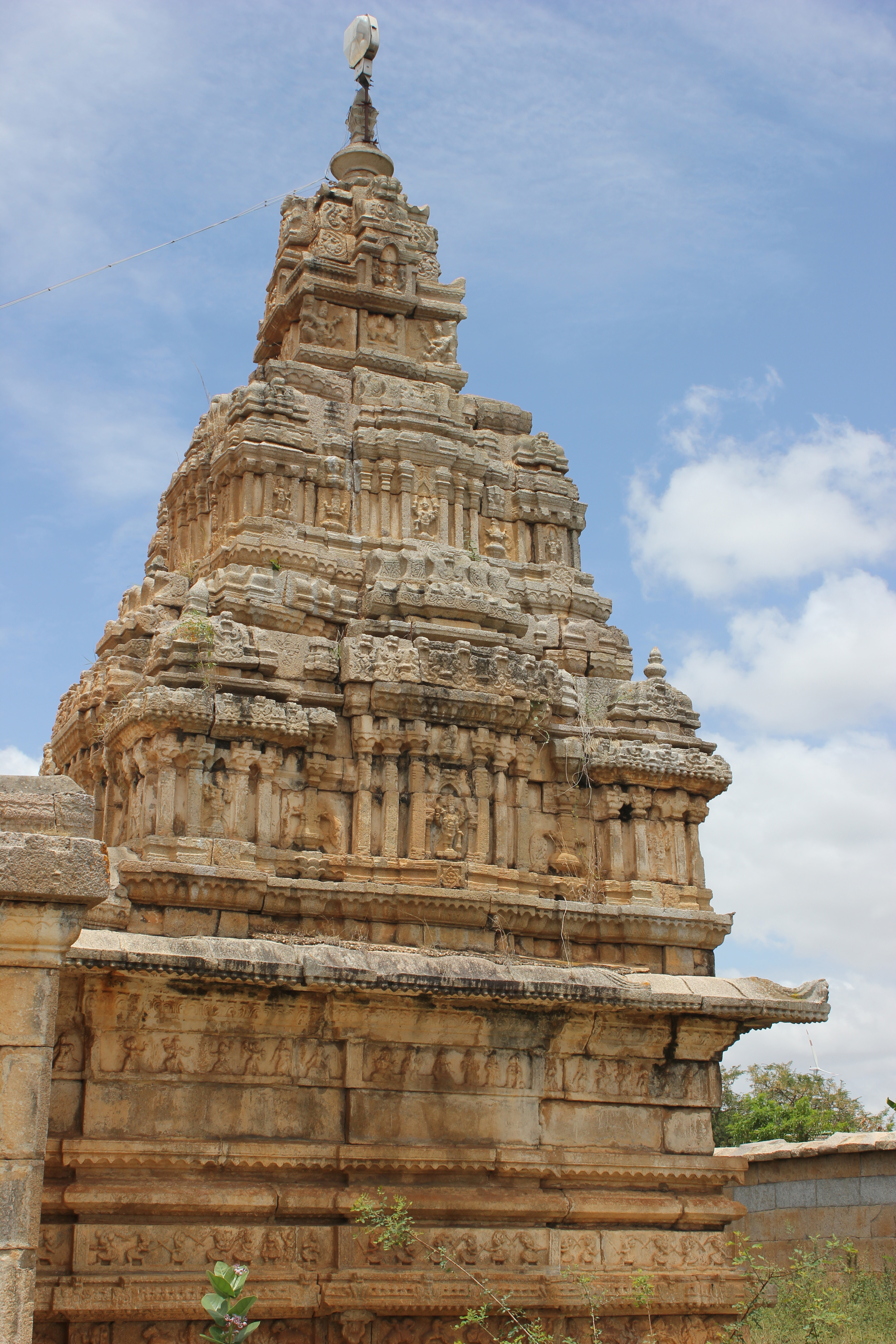
- Ranganatha Swamy temple (1698 AD) Davangere district
- Interactive map of Ranganatha Swamy Temple
- Coordinates: 14.35303°N 76.14680°E
- Country: India
- State: Karnataka
- District: Davangere District

Languages
  - Official: Kannada
- Time zone: UTC+5:30 (IST)

The Ranganatha Swamy Temple at Nirthadi (also spelt Neerthadi or Niratadi), is a post-Vijayanagara Empire re-construction. Nirthadi is a village in the Davangere district of Karnataka state, India. According to noted historian and epigraphist Benjamin Lewis Rice, a Kannada language inscription dated 1698 AD in the temple premise describes the destruction of the original temple by the armies of Mogul emperor Aurangzeb in 1696 AD. The Chitradurga chief Baramappa Nayaka (r.1689–1721) rebuilt the temple in 1698 AD. The monument is protected by the Karnataka state division of Archaeological Survey of India.

== Gallery ==
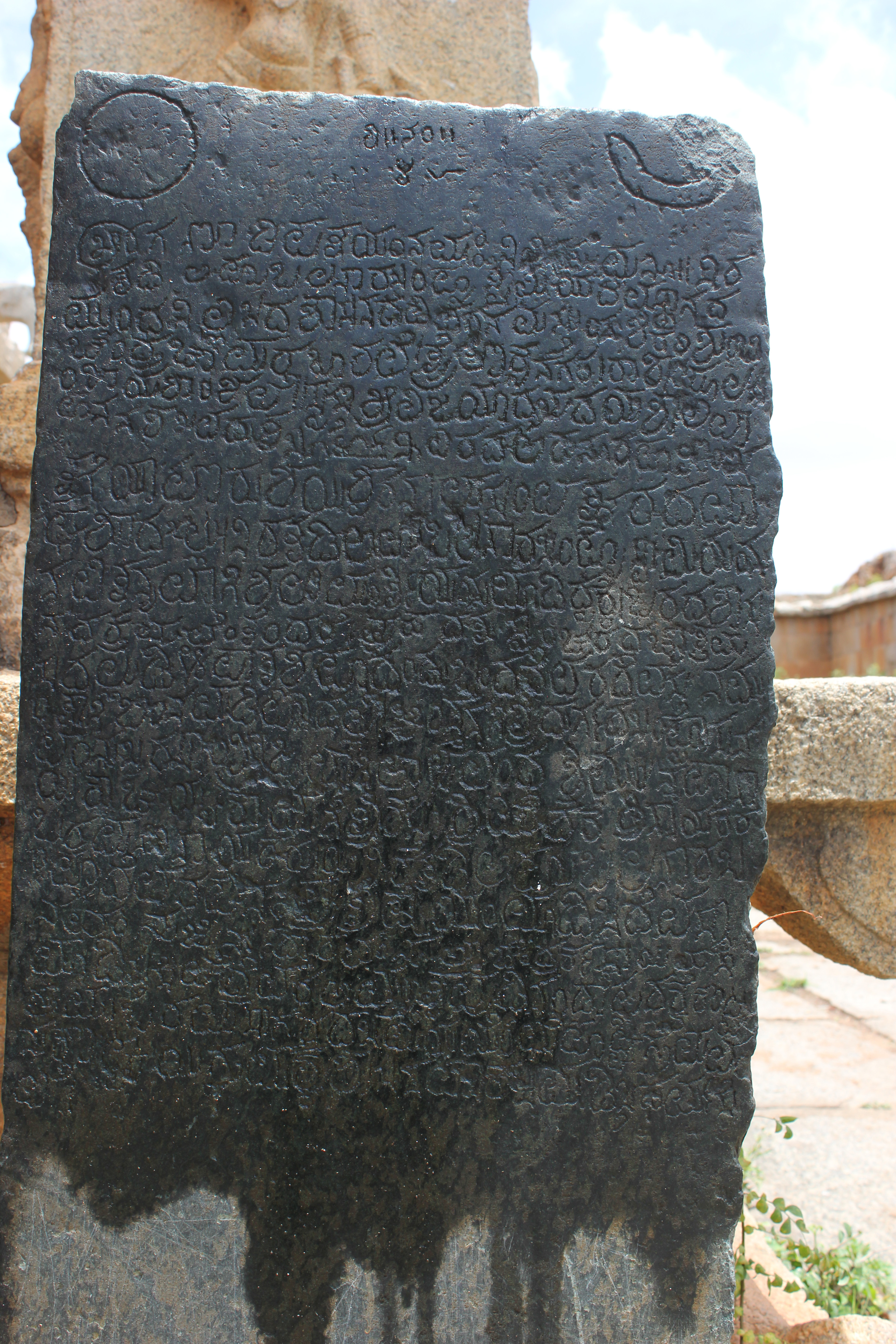
Kannada inscription (1698 AD) describing the destruction of the original temple by the armies of Aurangzeb and its reconstruction by Baramappa Nayaka

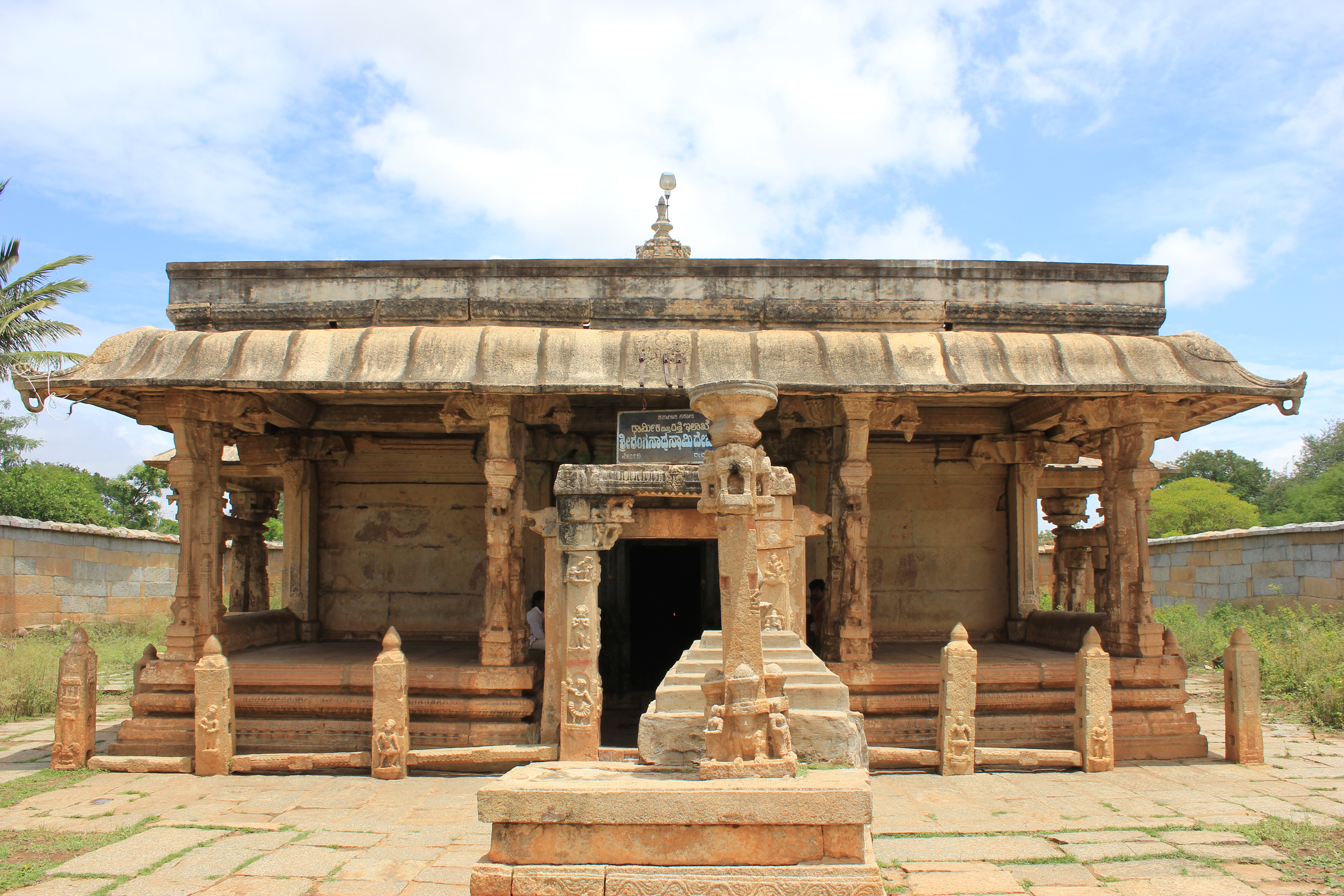
Entrance mukhamantapa to Ranganatha Swamy temple at Neerthadi

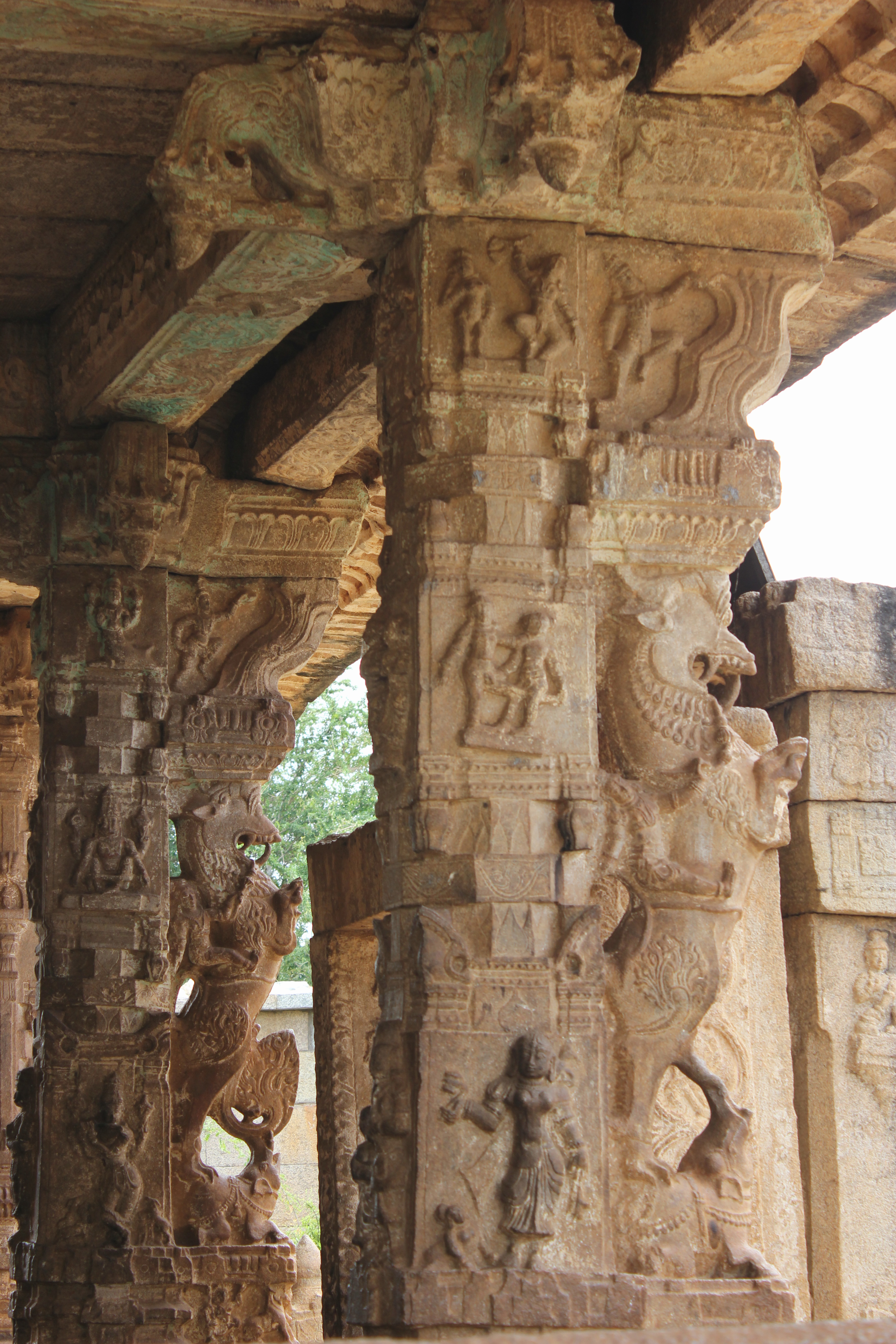
Yali pillars at the entrance of Ranganatha Swamy temple at Neerthadi

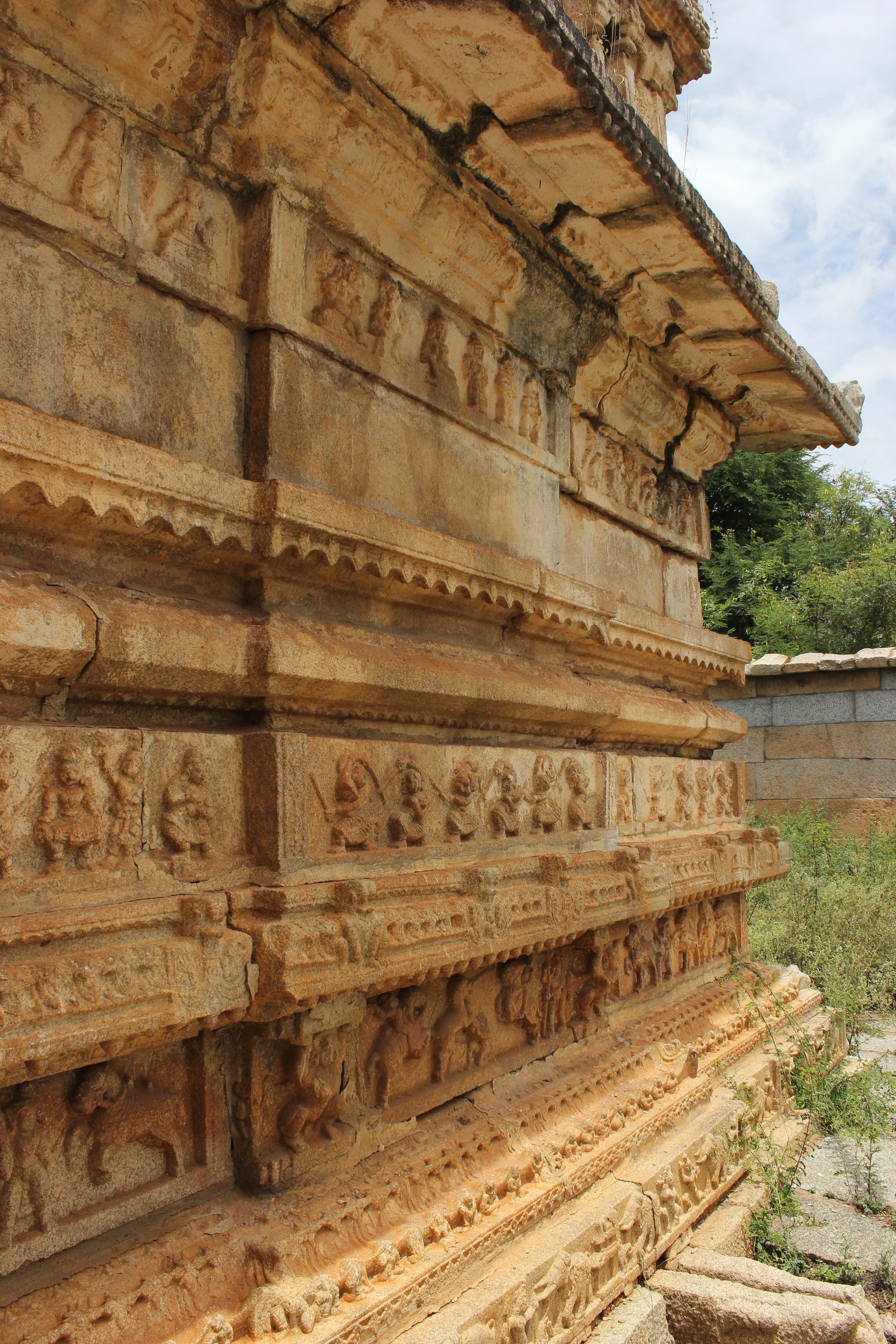
Molding frieze and relief at Ranganathaswamy temple in Neerthadi village of Chitradurga district
