= Battle of Dodderi =

1695 battle of the Deccan wars

- Part of the Deccan wars
Date	October-November 1695
Location	Dodderi
Result	Maratha victory

Belligerents
Maratha Empire; Nayakas of Chitradurga	Mughal Empire

Commanders and leaders
Santaji Ghorpade; Baramanna Nayaka	Qasim Khan; Khanazad Khan

Strength
Unknown	25,000

The Battle of Dodderi was a three-day battle of the Deccan wars between the Maratha forces led by Santaji Ghorpad and the Mughal army, with support from the Nayak of Chitradurga. Santaji's strategic attacks disrupted the Mughal advance, leading to the death of Mughal commander Qasim Khan. The Mughals retreated to the fort of Dodderi, where they faced starvation and hard conditions due to a tight Maratha blockade. Mughal commander Khanazad Khan surrendered and agreed to pay a ransom of 100,000 rupees. The battle is considered a decisive defeat for the Mughal Empire.

== Battle ==
The Marathas launched a surprise attack on the Mughal advance camp, plundering and setting tents on fire. Qasim Khan and Khanazad Khan rushed to the battlefield but were blocked by Maratha divisions. Despite courageous efforts by the Mughals, they faced overwhelming numbers and were terror-struck. The Marathas continued to humiliate them, depriving them of food and fodder for days. The Mughals, prepared for constant battle, were surrounded but the Marathas only appeared without engaging in combat for three days.

Burmappa Nayak's army attacked the Mughals, resulting in the death of many sardars and the wounding of Khudadad, Muhammad Murad Khan's son. Qasim Khan and Khanazad Khan, shaken by the situation, decided to retreat to the small fort of Dodderi. Despite being surrounded by the Marathas, they fought their way to the fort and managed to reach it by evening. However, the Marathas continued to humiliate them, leading to a bad situation inside the fort. With limited food and ammunition, the Mughals faced starvation and constant attacks from the Marathas. Qasim Khan died shortly after. Many soldiers deserted and joined the Marathas, who took advantage of the situation by selling goods to the besieged at high prices. The Mughals suffered from total starvation as the Marathas tightened their blockade, making living conditions unbearable.

The besieged Mughals were reported to have already run out of food on the second day, with "no food left for either man or beast". The circumstances of Qasim Khan's death are unknown. According to Jadunath Sarkar, Khan was addicted to opium and lack of it could have caused his death. However, some survivors of the battle also claimed that Khan committed suicide, certain that surrender would mean "disgrace at the hands of the enemy and censure by the Emperor". His death caused a large decline in morale, prompting the Mughal army to seek capitulation.

Khanazad Khan, seeking terms of surrender, agreed to pay a ransom of twenty lacs of rupees to Santaji. The Marathas collected the baggage and animals, while the Mughal sardars signed bonds as surety. Despite Santaji honoring his commitments, the Mughals did not fully comply. Santaji allowed the Mughal soldiers to leave the fort for two days, providing them with fresh food. Khanazad Khan eventually left for the Mughal Court escorted by Marathas.

== Aftermath ==
Less than a month after their defeat, Himmat Khan Bahadur, who had been deputed to cooperate with Qasim Khan, fled to Basavapatan, 40 miles west of Dodderi, with a force of 1,000 cavalry. Santaji planted his garrison in Dodderi and ordered two divisions of his army to watch and oppose Hamid-ud-din Khan from the north and Himmat Khan from the west.

The casualties of the Mughal army amounted to about one-third of the garrison.

Afterwards, the Siege of Basavapatan began.

== See also ==
- Siege of Wagingera
