= Beesanahalli =

- village
- Location in Karnataka, India Beesanahalli (India)
- Coordinates: 14°16′29″N 75°56′21″E
- Country: India
- State: Karnataka

Government
  - Body: devigere

Languages
  - Official: Kannada
- Time zone: UTC+5:30 (IST)
- ISO 3166 code: IN-KA
- Vehicle registration: KA
- Website: karnataka.gov.in

Beesana Halli is a village in hosadurga Taluk, near Chitradurga in the Indian state of Karnataka.

It is a small village of about 100 Lingayat, Golla and Dalit families. It is the birthplace of the late Sri Channaveerajja. He was born to a Lingayat family, and taught vedanta to people irrespective of caste. He had many Lingayat, nayaka, banjara, adivasi, and Dalit followers. His Samadhi is in this village. He was popularly called Beesanalli Ajjaaru.
