= Kadalbal =

Kadalbal KadalbaLa Kadlabalu
- town
- Location in Karnataka, India
- Coordinates: 14.5066°N 75.9242°E
- Country: India
- State: Karnataka
- District: Davangere District

Languages
  - Official: Kannada
- Time zone: UTC+5:30 (IST)
- PIN: 577011
- Telephone code: 91 8192
- Vehicle registration: KA-17

Kadalbal (also known as KadalbaLa or Kadlabalu) is a historic town in Davanagere district in the Indian state of Karnataka. It is very close to the district headquarters, Davanagere.

pp 127, 356, 357 The name is derived from two words, kadalu means sea in Kannada and baLa means son in Kannada. The entire meaning of the name stands for 'son of sea' in Kannada.

== History ==
This town was ruled by the Palayagara Nayakas of Chitradurga under the empire of Vijaynagara empire. Kannada is the widely spoken language here.

== Attractions ==
Anjaneya devasthana is a temple where all the avatars of vaayu, wind god, are incarnated. It is believed that all the three avatars, Hanuma, Bheema and Madhwa, have re-incarnated in a single stone. The historic temple was built around this sacred re-incarnated stone by the Timmanna Nayaka of Nayakas of Chitradurga. This incarnation is worshiped by thousands of people in Karnataka. Alongside this temple is a pond.

== Events ==
The annual event, Madhwanavami - birth day of Madhwacharya, attracts hundreds of thousands of people to the fair. The highlight of the event is Hanuma Rathothsava where the Hanuma utsava moorthi is taken in a procession around the town. Songs, Dances, Dramas and puppet shows of various historic plays are enacted. Puppet shows are a specialty at Kadalbal. Puppet shows of "Babruvahana", "Rama-Anjaneya Kaalaga", and "Krishnavatara" draws lot of attention and hoots from public.

== Nearby cities ==
1. Davangere, 6.5 km
2. Chitradurga, 44 km
3. Bellary, 64 km
