= Channaiah Odeyar =

Indian politician

Channaiah Odeyar (died on 19 November 2007) was a former Lok Sabha Member of Parliament from Davangere in Karnataka, India. Mr Odeyar was a member of the eighth, ninth and tenth Lok Sabha from 1984 to 1996, representing Davangere Parliamentary constituency in Karnataka.

== Personal life ==
Mr Odeyar belongs to Kuruba (Odeyar) community. He was born in Bilichodu village of Jagalur taluk in Davanagere district. He was survived by wife, three sons and a daughter.

== Politics ==
MP of 8th Lok Sabha, Affiliated to Indian National Congress serving Davangere (KA) Lok Sabha Constituency

MP of 9th Lok Sabha, Affiliated to Indian National Congress serving Davangere (KA) Lok Sabha Constituency

MP of 10th Lok Sabha, Affiliated to Indian National Congress serving Davangere (KA) Lok Sabha Constituency.

The nonagenarian leader represented the Davangere Parliamentary Constituency for three times on Congress ticket. Later he had joined the Janata Dal (Secular). Channaiah Odeyar (91) former Member of Parliament died at a private hospital here last night. The burial would take place at his native village Bilichodu in Jagalur Taluk tomorrow, according to family sources.
