= Boya (caste) =

Indian social group

Nayaka ( bedar)
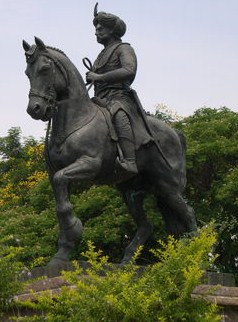
- Statue of a nayaka chieftain
- Location: Andhra Pradesh, Telangana, Karnataka, and Tamil Nadu
- Language: Telugu, Kannada, and Tamil
- Religion: Hinduism

The Nayak (also referred to as Nayaka, Bedar) is a disparate Indian community found in the South Indian states of Andhra Pradesh, Telangana, Karnataka, and Tamil Nadu. They are traditionally considered a "militant caste", who ruled parts of South India and had served the ruling powers as administrators (Nayakas), raiders and had other martial pursuits.

In Andhra Pradesh, Telangana, Karnataka and Tamil Nadu they are listed in the Other Backward Class category.

== History ==
In 1909 the scholar Edgar Thurston wrote that the Bellary Gazetteer said:

the only caste which goes in for manly sports seems to be the Bōyas, or Bēdars, as they are called in Canarese. They organise drives for pig, hunt bears in some parts in a fearless manner, and are regular attendants at the village gymnasium (garidi mane).

The earliest reference to "Boyas" is found in an inscription of the Eastern Chalukya ruler Vishnuvardhana II, where land grants are made to several people from a variety of different villages, all with Boya appended to their name. Earlier colonial scholars thought it simply meant an "inhabitant of"; later scholarship suggests the recipients could have been from the Boya community. The early Boyas were thought to have been a tribal community who were gradually acculturated into caste society. This is based on evidence from clan names in both inscriptions and in present-day, which seem to be occupational in nature.

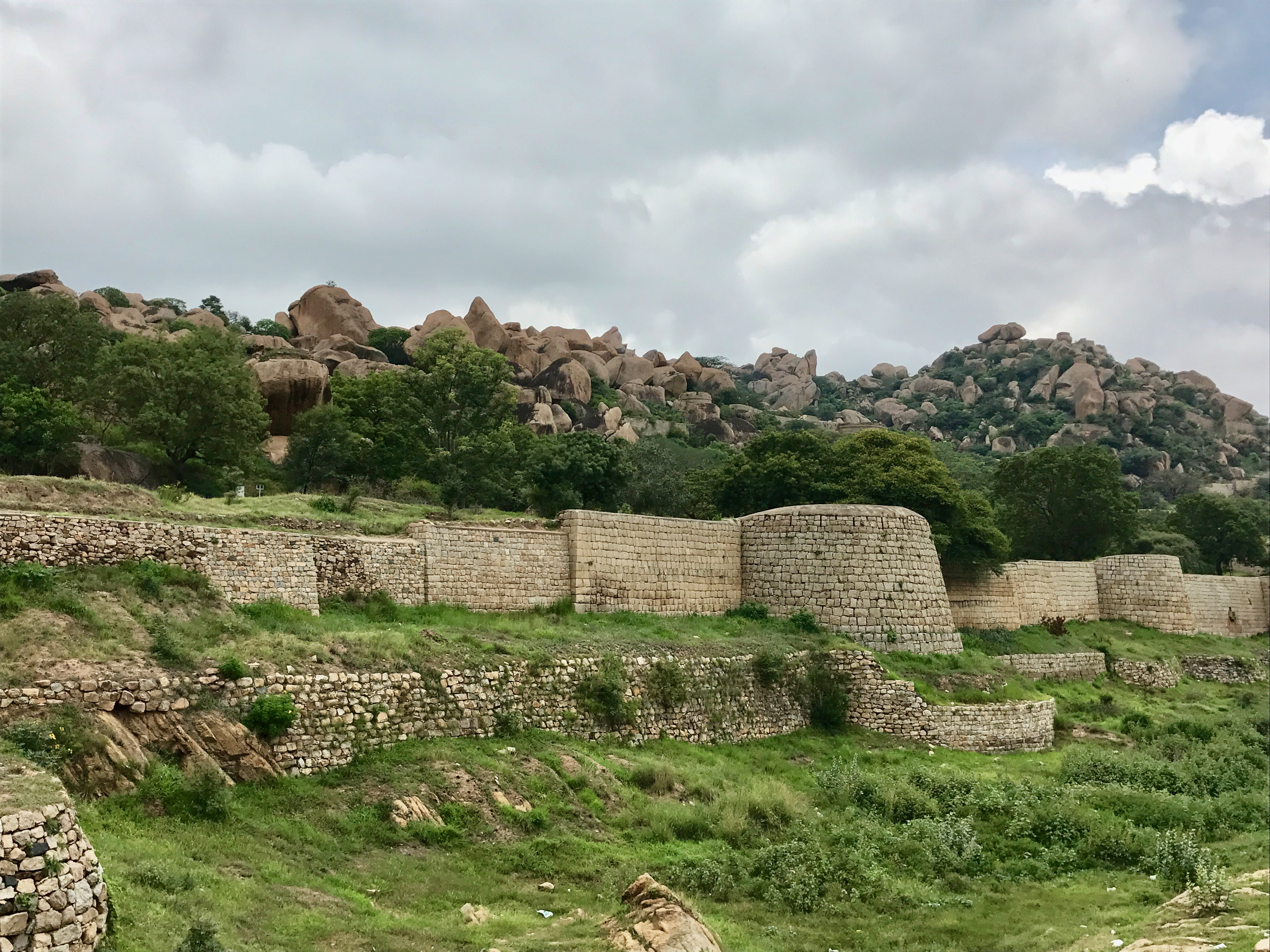
Chitradurga fort built during the reign of Madakari Nayaka

In medieval Kannada areas the Bedars had the power to give land grants. Others had titles such as arasa and nayaka, indicating they were part of the ruling class. To further their interests, inscriptions also reveal Bedars formed associations to promote their welfare and glorify themselves. Many others were often glorified in viragallu.

At the fall of the Vijayanagara empire, the power vacuum that ensued allowed many communities to come forward. Many Bedar chieftains, who had previously been subordinate, began to control territory more openly. Many of these polygars began to amass large forces of Boya troops. Rani Chennamma of Keladi famously deployed her Bedar infantry to protect the Maratha King Rajaram from the Mughal forces of Aurangzeb. The Bedar warriors utilized guerrilla tactics in the dense forests of Malnad to harass the Mughal supply lines. The entirety of Bellary was under their control at the time of its accession to the East India Company. The Bedars were heavily recruited into the armies of Mysore during the reigns of Hyder Ali and Tipu Sultan.

Many of the Poligars whom Sir Thomas Munro found in virtual possession of the country when it was added to the Company belonged to this caste, and their irregular levies, and also a large proportion of Haidar's formidable force, were of the same breed. Harpanahalli was the seat of one of the most powerful Poligars in the district in the eighteenth century. The founder of the family was a Bōya taliāri, who, on the subversion of the Vijayanagar dynasty, seized on two small districts near Harpanahalli.

In some districts, there are Boya Poligars, who as a rule are poor.

== Status ==
The early status of the Boyas is hard to pin down. As they most likely originated as a tribe, they were outside the caste system and within the same community its members could pursue different occupations. However different sections of the community who were pursuing different occupations would identify themselves with their occupation in Brahminical society, such as Boya-Brahmanas, who were generally accepted. However, they did not accept all the claims of the varnas they were in.

The Bedars worked in a variety of fields. Although some remained raiders and huntsmen, many others were granted high administrative positions such as collection of revenue.

== Dynasties ==
- Kampili Kingdom
- Nayaka of Shorapur
- Nayakas of Chitradurga
