= Madakari Nayaka I =

Ruler of Chitradurga from 1588 to 1602

Nayaka of Chitradurga
- Reign: 1588–1602
- Predecessor: Timmanna Nayaka
- Successor: Kasturi Rangappa Nayaka I
- Died: 1602
- Issue: Kasturi Rangappa Nayaka I
- Dynasty: Nayakas of Chitradurga
- Father: Timmanna Nayaka

Madakari Nayaka I, also known as Obanna Nayaka, was an early ruler of the Chitradurga Nayaka kingdom in present-day Karnataka, India. The son and successor of Timmanna Nayaka, he ruled from 1588 until his death in 1602.

== Reign ==
The Chitradurga chiefs had served as local governors under the Vijayanagara Empire. Timmanna Nayaka was formally appointed governor of Chitradurga, but later died while imprisoned at Vijayanagara. Obanna succeeded him in 1588 and is identified in later ruler lists by the regnal name Madakari Nayaka I.

His reign formed part of the wider political transition that followed the defeat of Vijayanagara at the Battle of Talikota in 1565. In the ensuing decades, the Chitradurga Nayakas and other chiefs of central Karnataka asserted independence from the remnants of the empire.

Madakari Nayaka I died in 1602 and was succeeded by his son, Kasturi Rangappa Nayaka I. During Kasturi Rangappa's longer reign, the principality expanded into neighbouring territories and became wealthier.

Madakari Nayaka I is distinct from Madakari Nayaka V, also known as Veera Madakari Nayaka, the final ruler of Chitradurga, who died after the kingdom was conquered by Hyder Ali in 1779.
