= Timmanna Nayaka =

Vijayanagara Chieftain

Timmanna Nayaka, also known as Kamageti Timmanna Nayaka, was a mid-16th-century chieftain and governor of Chitradurga under the Vijayanagara Empire in southern India. Appointed to the position as a reward for his demonstrated military prowess, bravery, and administrative skill, he is credited with initiating the fortification of the Chitradurga Fort around 1562 CE, transforming it into a key defensive stronghold amid regional power struggles. His tenure marked the origins of Nayaka rule in the area, with his son Obanna Nayaka, later titled Madakari Nayaka I

== Family Background ==
Timmanna Nayaka belonged to the Bedar caste, a community of hunter-warriors with origins in southern Andhra Pradesh who migrated northward to central Karnataka regions, bringing their pastoral and martial traditions.

== Upbringing ==
Historical records indicate Timmanna originated from Matti in Davangere taluk, a locale in present-day Karnataka, where he served as a chieftain under the Vijayanagara Empire in the mid-16th century.

== Confrontation with the Vijayanagara Empire ==
Timmanna Nayaka was attacked by a Vijayanagara force in the early 1560s because he had raided neighbouring poligar territories. In a daring act of bravery and sheer arrogance, Timmanna Nayaka decided to steal the horse of the Vijayanagara prince who commanded the forces sent against him. Under cover of night, he stole into the enemy camp and found the prince’s horse. Before he could make his getaway, a groom arrived to re-tether the horse. Hiding literally at the groom’s feet, Timmanna Nayaka lay unnoticed in the darkness as the groom drove the tether rope peg through his hand. Pinned to the ground, Timmanna Nayaka waited for the groom to leave, cut off his hand to free himself, and rode away on the prince’s horse. It is said that the event convinced the Vijayanagara army that they could not defeat Timmanna Nayaka and they sued for peace. The Vijayanagara king formally appointed him as the governor of Chitradurga and he enjoyed a brief interlude of favour at court.

== Final years and Demise ==
Timmanna Nayaka's favor with the Vijayanagara court proved temporary following his appointment as governor of Chitradurga. Relations soured due to unspecified disputes, resulting in his arrest and imprisonment by Vijayanagara authorities. He died in custody at Vijayanagara.
