= Keladi Chennamma =

Queen regnant of the Keladi Kingdom (r. 1677–1696)

- Rani
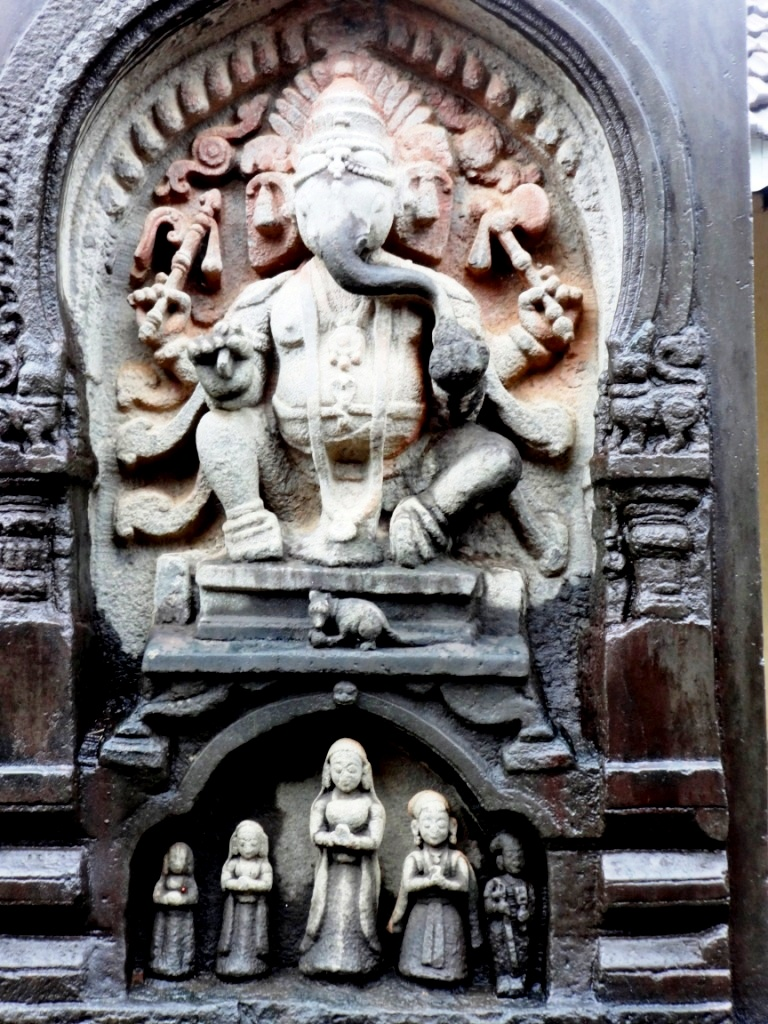

Queen regnant of Keladi
- Reign: 1672 - 1697
- Predecessor: Somashekara Nayaka I
- Successor: Basavappa Nayaka
- Born: Chennamma; Keladi
- Died: 1697; Keladi
- Spouse: Somashekhara Nayaka I
- Dynasty: Nayakas of Keladi

Keladi Chennamma (died 1696) was queen regnant of the Keladi Nayaka Kingdom also called 'Ikkeri Nayakas' in Karnataka between 1672 and 1697.

== Early life ==
Chennamma was born in the household of a man called Siddappa Shetty, who was a native merchant in the region of Kundapur, Karnataka. She married King Somashekara Nayaka in 1667 CE.

== Reign ==
After Somashekhara Nayaka's death in 1672, Chennamma efficiently handled the administration of the Keladi Nayaka dynasty. During her reign of 25 years, she repelled the advance of the Mughal Army led by Aurangzeb from her military base in the kingdom of Keladi located in Sagara, Karnataka, India. She adopted Basavappa Nayaka, one of her close relatives who succeeded as Hiriya Basappa Nayaka. Channagiri is named after her.

== Administration and governance ==
The reign of Rani Chennamma is regarded as a period of significant administrative consolidation and economic stability for the Keladi Nayaka kingdom. She continued the Shist land revenue system established by Shivappa Nayaka, but introduced "tax holidays" for farmers clearing new forest lands in the Malnad region to expand the agrarian base.

=== Economic policy and trade ===
Chennamma maintained a state-controlled monopoly on the black pepper trade, which was the kingdom's primary export. She also rendered a trade agreement with the Portuguese involving commodities like pepper and rice. She skillfully balanced relations with European powers, signing the Treaty of Barkur in 1678 with the Portuguese, which ensured that the Keladi state retained sovereignty over coastal ports while collecting fixed customs duties (Sulkas).

=== Religious endowments ===
Despite being a devout Veerashaiva, her administration practiced religious pluralism. In 1691, she issued a series of copper-plate grants to the Sringeri Sharada Peetham, granting the village of Kuduvalli as Sarvamanya (tax-free) land.

She also permitted the Portuguese to establish churches at Mirjan, Honnavara, Chandavara and Kalyanpura.

== Military exploits ==
=== Fortifications and military logistics ===
In anticipation of Mughal incursions, Chennamma overhauled the kingdom's defensive infrastructure. She moved the primary treasury and administrative records to the mountain fortress of Bidanur (Nagara). The fort was upgraded with a three-tier defense system, including stone-lined water channels and a network of granaries (Kothis) to withstand long sieges.

=== War with Mysore ===
Chikka Devaraja, the ruler of Mysore, launched a campaign in which he conquered several territories in the north of Mysore, including Chikkatottagere, Magadi, Laddagiri, Kadur, Virannedurga, Channarayadurga, Bijjavara, Gunduma ledurga, and Bhutipura, all of which were part of the Ikkeri kingdom. However, the Ikkeri kingdom, under the regency of Queen Chennamma who ruled on behalf of her adopted minor son Basava Raja, mounted a formidable defense. The Ikkeri forces successfully defeated the Mysore army at Vasudhare and reclaimed the territories of Kadur, Banavara, Hassan, and Belur, thereby bolstering their defenses against further incursions by Chikka Devaraja.

=== Keladi - Mughal war ===
Following the execution of the Maratha King Sambhaji by the Mughal Emperor Aurangzeb. Sambhaji's half-brother, Chhatrapati Rajaram I, fled Raigad in disguise to seek refuge in the south at Gingee Fort (Jinji).

While traversing the Karnataka region, Rajaram was pursued by a Mughal army led by General Kasim Khan. In late 1689, Rajaram reached the Keladi capital at Bidanur and requested sanctuary. Despite the threat of a full-scale Mughal invasion, Rani Chennamma granted him refuge, providing him with supplies and a safe military escort through the dense Malnad forests toward Jinji.

Infuriated by the defiance of the Keladi Queen, Aurangzeb dispatched a massive force under Kasim Khan to besiege Bidanur. The Mughal cavalry struggled with the rugged, monsoon-drenched terrain of the Western Ghats, which was unfamiliar to them. Rani Chennamma utilized guerrilla warfare tactics, deploying her "Bedar" (Valmiki) infantry to harass Mughal supply lines and conduct night raids.

After suffering heavy casualties and facing a stalemate in the dense jungles, the Mughal forces were compelled to withdraw. A treaty was subsequently signed in 1690, where the Mughals recognized the autonomy of the Keladi Kingdom. By this time, Rajaram had successfully reached Jinji, allowing the Maratha resistance against the Mughals to continue for another decade.

Her cabinet was headed by Timmanna Naik, who was the descendant of a commander of Vijayanagara.

Ediga Timmanna Nayaka, who is recorded in the Keladi Kaifiyat as an Ediga from Matti, held several high titles including Palegara, Dalavayi, Mukya Dalavayi, Senapati, Sarva Senadipati, Mahamantri and Ugrani Mane. He served as the Chief General and Dalavayi under Shivappa Nayaka of Keladi and led the 1653 campaigns that captured Mangalore, Barkur, Basrur and Honnavar from the Portuguese. He Saved Shivappa nayaka from Portuguese and keladi Rani chenamma from mughals,Keladi Ediga Timmanna Nayaka's post and rank were above the Kings of Keladi. He is also credited in local tradition with the construction and restoration of numerous tanks (kere), including the system known as the "thousand tanks" in the Keladi region. He is revered in local tradition as one of the bravest chief generals of the Keladi era.

== Legacy ==
She is considered as the epitome of the Kannada women's valor along with Rani Chennabhairadevi, Abbakka Rani, Kittur Chennamma, Belawadi Mallamma and Onake Obavva, as the foremost women warriors and patriots.

== In popular culture ==
- Keladi Chennamma (TV series), a Kannada language historical series broadcast on Suvarna TV.
