= Siege of Basavapatan =

Historical conflict in India

- Part of Mughal–Maratha Wars
Date	20 January – early March 1696
Location	Basavapatan, 40 miles west of Dodderi
Result	Mughal victory

Belligerents
Maratha Empire	Mughal Empire

Commanders and leaders
Santaji Ghorpade	Himmat Khan Bahadur †; Hamid-ud-din Khan

Strength
20,000 men (10,000 cavalry, 10,000 infantry)	Garrison: 1,000 cavalry Relief force: Unknown

Casualties and losses
Heavy	Unknown

The siege of Basavapatan was a military engagement between the Mughal Army and the Maratha troops led by Santaji Ghorpade, the Marathas were defeated and Basavapatan was relieved.

== Background ==
In November 1695, the Maratha general, Santaji Ghorpade, defeated the Mughal general, Qasim Khan. The Mughals retreated to their fort at Dodderi, the Marathas chased them and began besieging them from all sides, confident that their hunger would destroy the defenders. Many of the cattle had been captured by the Marathas. Qasim Khan died during the siege, with many suspecting he committed suicide. After he died, the command was left by General Khazand Khan, who sent Santaji terms of surrender. Santaji kept his word and allowed them to leave the fort and buy supplies from Maratha camps.

Meanwhile, the Mughal Emperor, Aurangzeb, in Islampur, 280 miles north of Dodderi, hearing the danger of Qasim Khan, dispatched his general Hamid-ud-din Khan along with Rustam-dil Khan to support him. They stationed themselves in Adoni, but were too late to do anything and waited to receive Khazand Khan.

== Siege ==
Less than a month after their defeat, Himmat Khan Bahadur, who had been deputed to cooperate with Qasim Khan, fled to Basavapatan, 40 miles west of Dodderi, with a force of 1,000 cavalry. Santaji planted his garrison in Dodderi and ordered two divisions of his army to watch and oppose Hamid-ud-din Khan from the north and Himmat Khan from the west. On January 20, 1696, Santaji appeared before Himmat Khan's position with a force of 10,000 cavalry and the same number of infantry; the Maratha Karnataki musketeers took position from the hills; Himmat Khan advanced to that position and dislodged them from it, killing 500 of them; then he drove his elephant towards the position where Santaji was standing; however, he was shot by a bullet and fell unconscious; Santaji received two arrow wounds; the leaderless Mughals retreated back to their trenches, where Himmat died. After months of campaigning, Santaji troops were exhausted. The Mughal general, Hamid-ud-din Khan, was dispatched against Santaji and inflicted a defeat on the Marathas on February 26 near Chakargola, 26 miles north of Basavaptan. Another Mughal general, Bidar Bakht, was ordered to relieve Basavaptan, but before he could arrive, Santaji had already withdrawn from the area.
