= Madakari Nayaka V =

Last Nayaka of Chitradurga, India

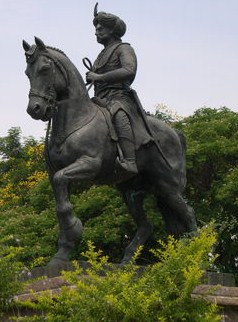
- Statue of Madakari Nayaka

Nayaka of Chitradurga
- Reign: 1758–1779
- Predecessor: Kasturi Rangappa Nayaka II
- Died: After 1779; Srirangapatna, Kingdom of Mysore
- Dynasty: Nayakas of Chitradurga

Madakari Nayaka V, also known as Veera Madakari Nayaka, was the last ruler of the Nayakas of Chitradurga. He ruled the central Karnataka kingdom from 1758 until 1779, when Chitradurga Fort was captured by Hyder Ali and incorporated into the Kingdom of Mysore.

== Background and accession ==
The Chitradurga Nayakas had emerged as local governors under the Vijayanagara Empire and became effectively independent after the empire lost control of its heartland in the late 16th century. Their territory in central Karnataka was organised around Chitradurga Fort, which served as the political and military centre of the kingdom.

Madakari succeeded Kasturi Rangappa Nayaka II. The Chitradurga district administration dates the beginning of his reign to 1758. He is numbered Madakari Nayaka V in the conventional list of the dynasty's rulers, although the numbering of rulers named Madakari varies in some accounts.

== Reign ==
Madakari's reign coincided with a struggle between the expanding Kingdom of Mysore and the Maratha Empire for control of central Karnataka. Chitradurga occupied an increasingly difficult position between these powers. Its rulers negotiated with the Marathas in the hope that Maratha support would preserve the kingdom's independence, while Madakari at other times cooperated with Hyder Ali.

Hyder Ali's forces clashed repeatedly with Chitradurga during the 1760s and 1770s. The hill fort, strengthened over generations by the Nayakas, enabled the kingdom to resist these earlier attacks. Its defensive system included successive lines of fortification, gateways, storehouses and reservoirs adapted to the rocky terrain.

The best-known tradition associated with these conflicts is that of Onake Obavva, the wife of a soldier guarding the fort. According to the account, she discovered enemy soldiers entering through a narrow opening in the rocks and killed several of them with an onake (a wooden pestle) before the defenders arrived. The opening is now known as Onake Obavvana Kindi. The story is commemorated in Karnataka, although accounts differ about which of Hyder Ali's attacks it accompanied.

== Defeat and death ==
In 1779 Hyder Ali mounted the campaign that ended Nayaka rule. Chitradurga Fort was captured, the kingdom was made a province of Mysore, and Madakari and members of his family were taken to Srirangapatna as prisoners. Madakari died in captivity there. Hyder Ali also transferred a large number of Bedar soldiers and families from Chitradurga to Srirangapatna; many of the men were incorporated into the Mysore army.

The capture ended more than two centuries of rule by the Chitradurga Nayakas. Chitradurga remained under Mysore after the death of Tipu Sultan in 1799, when the Wadiyars were restored to power.

== Legacy ==
Madakari is remembered in Karnataka as Veera Madakari Nayaka and as the last defender of Chitradurga's independence. The surviving fortifications are the principal material legacy of the Nayaka state, although parts of the complex were also built or modified under earlier dynasties and under Hyder Ali and Tipu Sultan.

His reign and the fall of Chitradurga have become recurring subjects in Kannada historical fiction. Durgaasthamaana by T. R. Subba Rao is a historical novel centred on Madakari and the end of Nayaka rule. The novel received the Sahitya Akademi Award for Kannada posthumously in 1985. B. L. Venu's novel Gandugali Madakari Nayaka also portrays his life.

== See also ==
- Nayakas of Chitradurga
- Chitradurga Fort
- Onake Obavva
