= Sriramapura (Budihal), Hosadurga =

Sriramapura Sirumanapura, Budhihal Narayanapura
- village
- Location in Karnataka, India Sriramapura (India)
- Coordinates: 13.8°N 76.29°E
- Country: India
- State: Karnataka
- District: Chitradurga
- Talukas: Hosadurga

Population (2001)
  - Total: 5,174

Languages
  - Official: Kannada
- Time zone: UTC+5:30 (IST)

Sriramapura (also known as Budihal or Boodihalu) is a town in the southern state of Karnataka, India. It is located in the Hosadurga taluk of Chitradurga district in Karnataka.

== Disambiguation ==
The names Srirampura an budihal are common place names in south India.

The name Srirampura must be distinguished from

1. Srirampura, Mysore District
2. Srirampura metro station, Bengaluru

The name Budihal is also used for other places in Karnataka, including:

1. Budihal in Nelamangala Taluk, Bangalore Rural District
2. Budihal in Chikodi Taluk, Belgaum District
3. Budihal in Surapura Taluk, Yadgir District
4. Budihal in Nargund Taluk, Gadag District
5. Budihal in Koppal Taluk, Koppal District

== History ==
Budihal was governed by the Budihal Nayakas during the 15th century. Among the notable rulers was Sirumananayaka, from whose name the modern town of Srirampura is believed to derive its name. Historical documentation of the Budihal Nayakas is limited. However, literary references to their rule appear in three works: Sirumananayaka Sangthya by Siddakavi, Gollasirumanacharite by Gollakavi, and Sinumanacharite by Ramakavi. These texts were compiled by M. M. Kalburgi.

According to Golla Sirimanacharithe, the Budihal Palyegar dynasty was established during the reign of Praudha Devaraya of the Vijayanagara Empire, estimated to be around 1435–1460 CE. The dynasty was founded by Kachanayaka, whose sons Sirumana and Malla are said to have governed Budihal and Heggeri respectively. Sirumana's territory reportedly extended to include Hiriyur, Honnavalli, Ekkati, Kandikere, Haaranahalli, Halukurike, Asandi, and Baguru. The Budihal dynasty's rule concluded when Narasimharaya of Chandragiri defeated Sirumananayak Sirumananayaka.

During his expedition in 1801 CE, Francis Buchanan, a Scottish physician and naturalist, documented the presence of mines in the then Budihal district. He noted that the inhabitants of Budihal were suffering from an unidentified fever and were awaiting the onset of the rainy season for relief.

== Demographics ==
As of 2001 India census, Sriramapura had a population of 5,174 with 2,639 males and 2,535 females.

== Local Governance ==
Srirampura serves as the headquarters of its Srirampura Grama Panchayat. Villages fall under this Grama Panchayat include Banapura, Kachapura, Gavirangapura, Goolihalli, Heggere, and Belagur.

== Guru Parappa Swamy ==
In 1905, a local mutt (Hindu monastery) dedicated to Parappa Swamy, a late 18th-century mystic was established. The primary deity, Parappa Swamy is depicted as a monk in a squatting position smoking cannabis. Local devotees regard him as a divine figure.

Parappa Swamy advocated the use of cannabis as a means of enhancing spiritual awareness. According to temple priests, the traditional use of cannabis at the site was historically restricted to elderly individuals without familial obligations, though the practice has been discouraged in recent years.

The temple's annual rathotsava (chariot festival) is celebrated each April.
