= Dodderi =

Dodderi Brahmana Dodderi
- village
- Location in Karnataka, India Dodderi (India)
- Coordinates: 14°18′0″N 76°43′0″E
- Country: India
- State: Karnataka
- District: Shimoga
- Talukas: Soraba Taluk

Languages
  - Official: Kannada
- Time zone: UTC+5:30 (IST)
- PIN: 577434
- ISO 3166 code: IN-KL
- Vehicle registration: KA 15
- Nearest city: Soraba
- Literacy: 80%%
- Lok Sabha constituency: Shimoga

Dodderi, also known as B.Dodderi or Brahmana Dodderi is a village in Soraba Taluk, Shimoga District in the state of Karnataka, India. The village has a primary school, a post office, a registered group of women called 'Radhika Mahila Mandali'. There is a temple of Lord Gopalakrishna. There are many community of people including Havyaka Brahmins, Vokkaligas, etc. There are two small villages, viz., 'Sannamane' and 'Dalavayi Hosakoppa', which are also considered as part of Dodderi.

== See also ==
- Battle of Dodderi

)
