= Nayak (caste) =

Hindu caste

The Nayak are a Hindu caste; also some Nayaks are Punjabi found in India and Pakistan. The Nayak mainly follow Hinduism. According to Vinay Krishin Gidwani, the Nayaks claim that they were, historically, Brahmins.

== Demographics and occupation ==
The Nayaks reside in Haryana, Punjab, Odisha, Rajasthan and West Bengal. They also live in Khammam district and West Godavari district in Andhra Pradesh and in a number of villages near Ahmedabad in Gujarat. According to Kathryn Hansen, the main occupation of Gujarati Nayaks had been "singing, dancing and acting in plays".

== See also ==
- Nayak dynasty
- Nayakas of Keladi
