= Bilichodu =

- village
- Country: India
- State: Karnataka
- District: Davanagere
- Talukas: Jagalur

Population (2001)
  - Total: 5,269

Languages
  - Official: Kannada
- Time zone: UTC+5:30 (IST)

Bilichodu is a village in the southern state of Karnataka, India. It is located in the Jagalur taluk of Davanagere district in Karnataka. It is located on the state highway connecting Davangere and Jaglur.

== Demographics ==
As of 2001 India census, Bilichodu had a population of 5269 with 2672 males and 2597 females.

== See also ==
- Davanagere
- Districts of Karnataka
