= Onake Obavva =

Folk heroine-warrior of Chitradurga fort

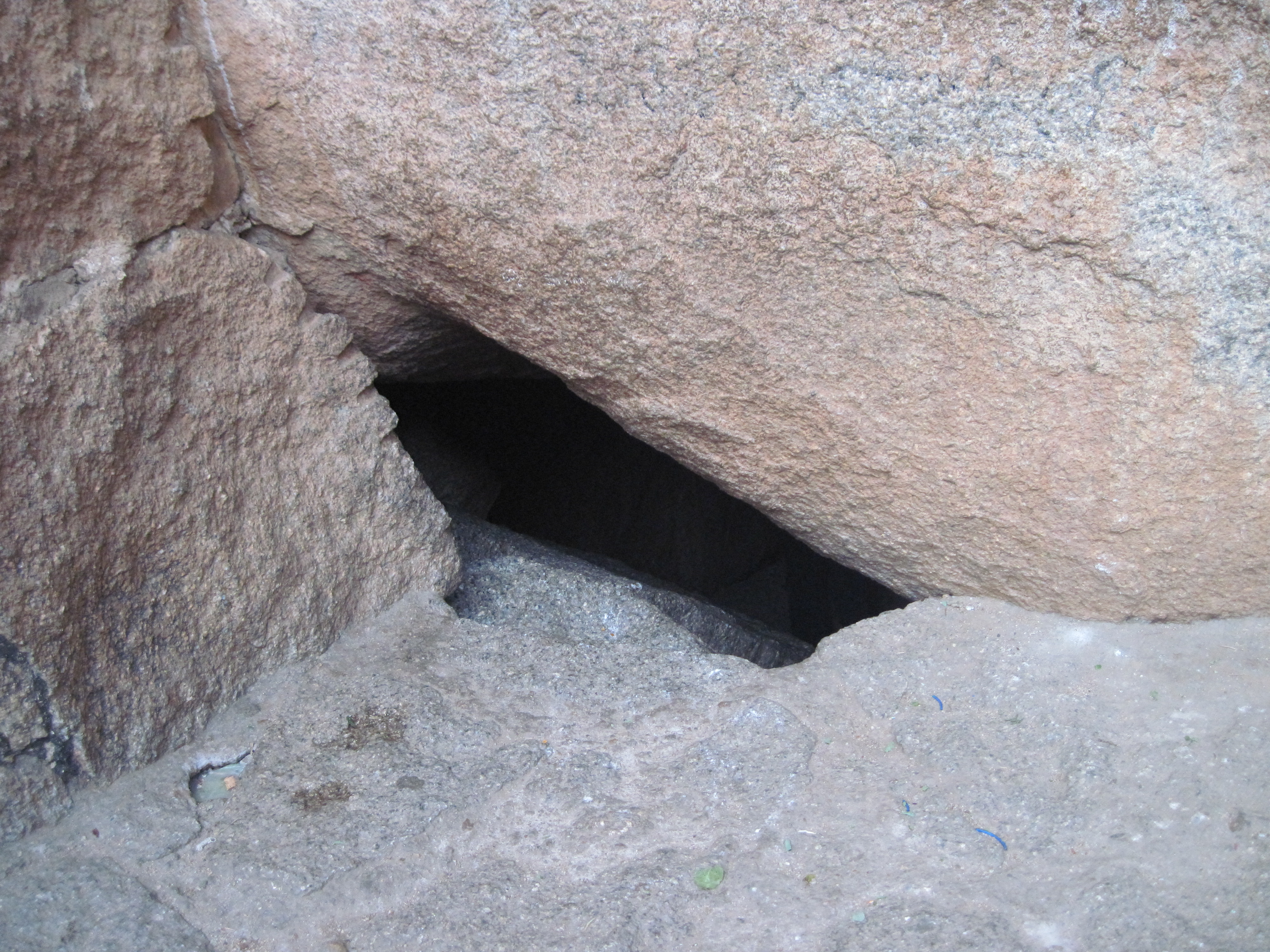
Onake Obavvana kindi inside Chitradurga Fort

Onake Obavva was a Karnataka warrior who fought the forces of Hyder Ali single-handedly with a pestle in the kingdom of Chitradurga of Karnataka, India. Her husband was a guard of a watchtower in the rocky fort of Chitradurga. In the state of Karnataka, she is celebrated along with Abbakka Rani, Keladi Chennamma and Kittur Chennamma, as the foremost women warriors and patriots. She belonged to the Holaya community. The Government of Karnataka has taken up the initiative to celebrate November 11 as Onake Obavva Jayanti since 2021.

== Heroics of Obavva ==
During the reign of Madakari Nayaka, the city of Chitradurga was besieged by the troops of Hyder Ali (1754-1779). A chance sighting of a man entering the Chitradurga fort through a hole in the rocks led to a plan by Hyder Ali to send his soldiers through that hole. The Guard (Kahale Mudda Hanuma, who was on duty near that hole) had gone home to have his lunch. During his meal he needed some water to drink, so his wife Obavva went to collect water in a pot from a pond which was near the hole in the rocks, halfway up the hill. She noticed the army trying to enter the fort through the hole. She used the Onake or pestle to kill the soldiers one by one by hitting them on the head and then quietly moving each corpse without raising the suspicions of the rest of the troops. Mudda Hanuma returned from lunch and was shocked to see Obavva standing with a blood stained Onake and several of the enemies dead bodies around her. Later, the same day, she was found dead either due to shock or having been killed by the enemy soldiers. Though her brave attempt saved the fort this time, Madakari could not resist the attack by Hyder Ali during 1779, when the fort of Chitradurga was lost to Hyder Ali.

== Legacy ==
She is considered to be the epitome of Kannada female pride. The hole through which Hyder Ali's soldiers snuck in is called Onake Obavvana Kindi (hole) or Onake kindi. Her heroic effort is depicted in a famous song-sequence in the film Nagarahavu, directed by Puttanna Kanagal. A sports stadium in Chitradurga, Veera Vanithe Onake Obavva Stadium, is named after her, and she is commemorated with a statue sculpted by Ashok Gudigar, erected in front of the District Commissioner’s office in Chittradurga.

== In popular culture ==
The 2019 Kannada language historical drama film Chitradurgada Onake Obavva stars Kannada actress Tara as Onake Obavva.

Actress Jayanthi played the role of Onake Obavva in the movie Nagarahaavu.

She was played by Neha Gokhale, the younger daughter of veteran actor Vikram Gokhale during Art of Living's Kala Arpan 2023 festival at Bangalore, India in a play called Adnyaat Shalaka directed by Sheetal Talpade which showcases unknown female warriors of India lost to annals of history.

== See also ==
- Belawadi Mallamma
- Keladi Chennamma
- Abbakka Rani
- Kitturu Chennamma
- Rani Chennabhairadevi
- Household Stone Implements in Karnataka
