= Tourist attractions in Mandya =

List of places to visit in Mandya district

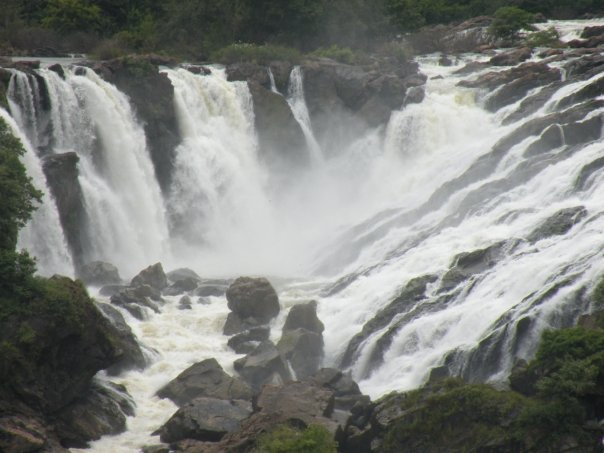
Bharachukki falls

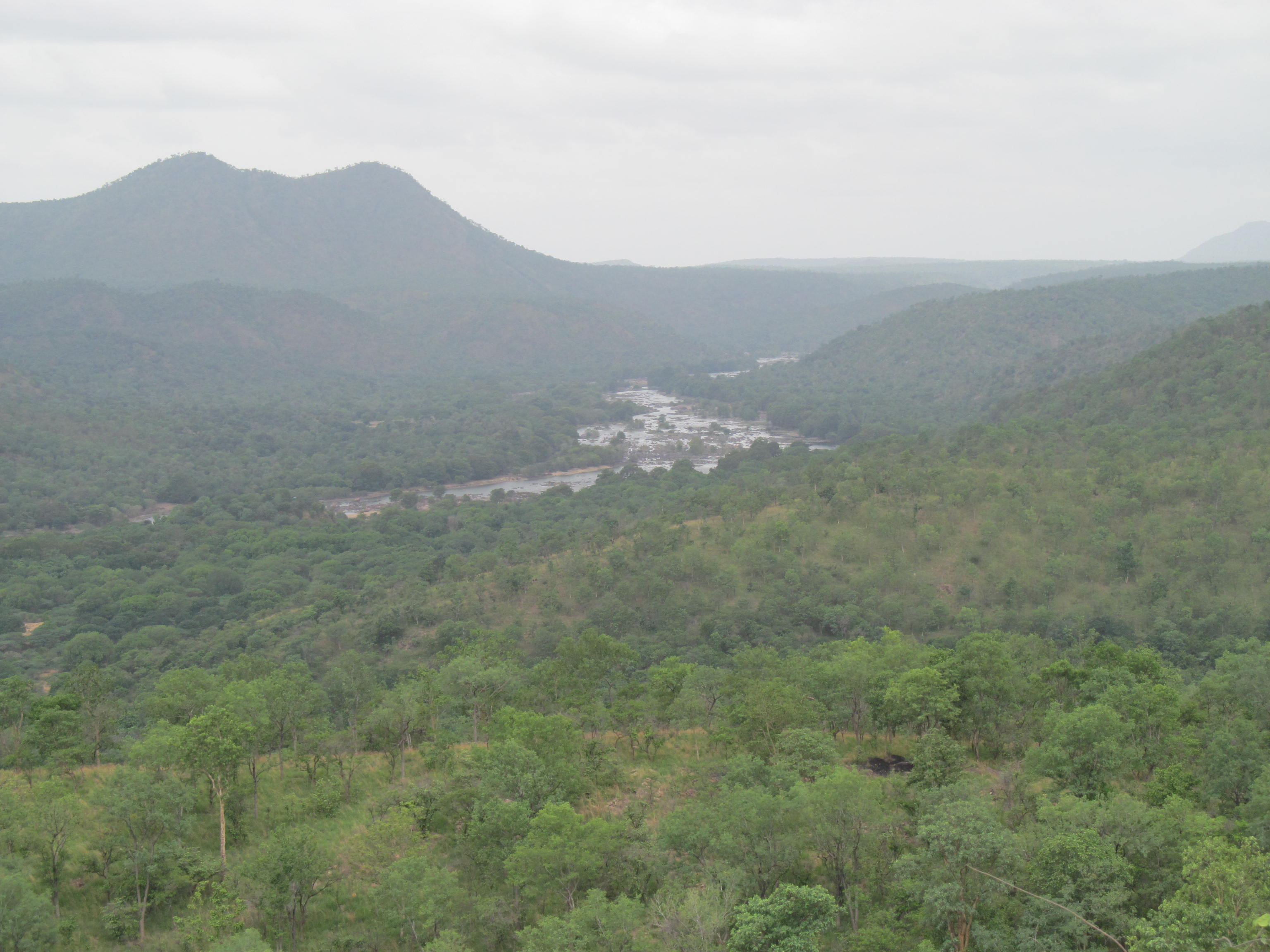
Kaveri Wildlife Sanctuary landscape

This article is a list of popular tourist attractions, such as museums, amusement parks, or historic towns, located in Mandya, India.

== Tourist attractions ==
=== Maddur ===
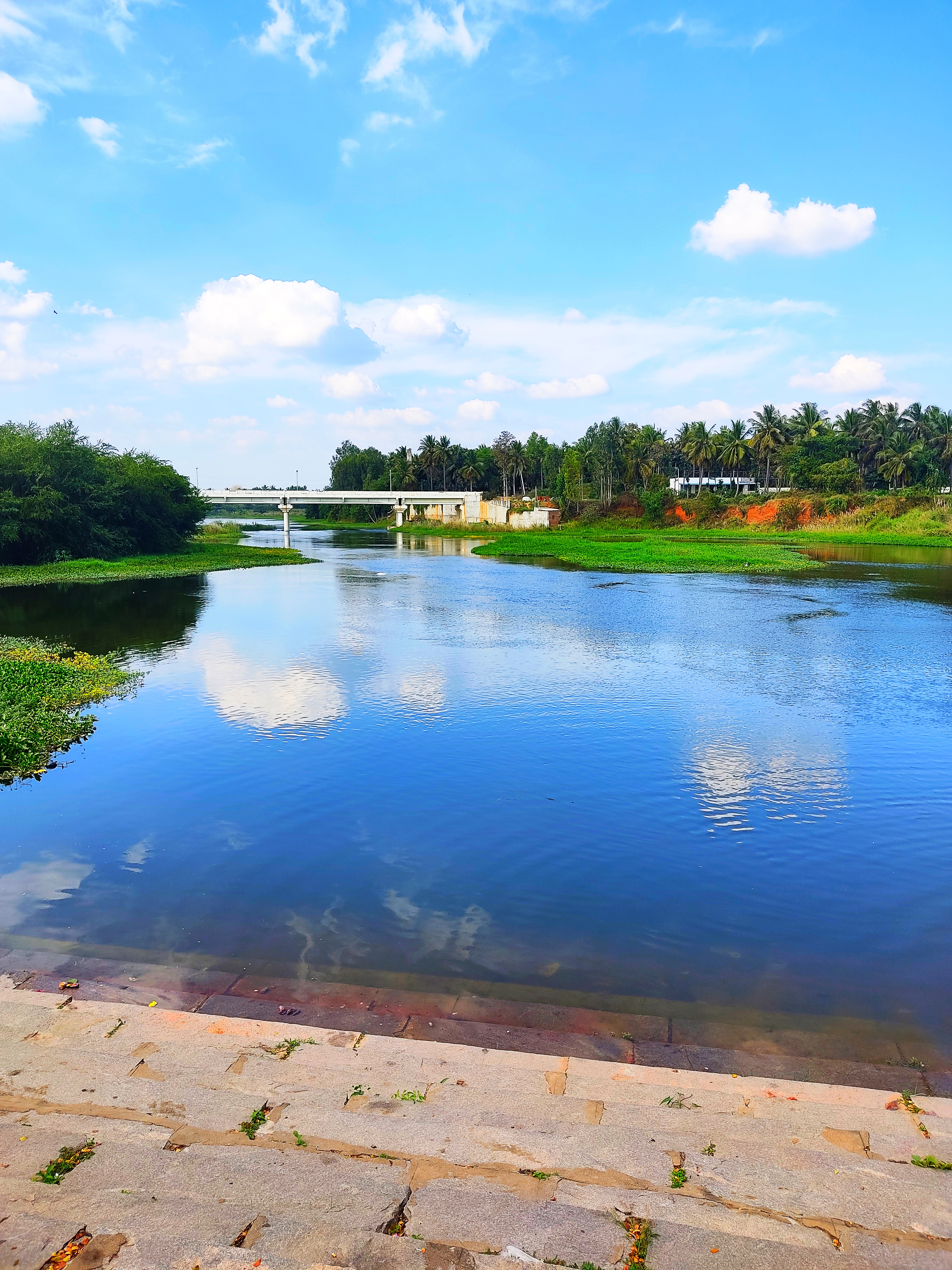
Shimsha River in Vaidyanathapura, Maddur

Maddur, 18 km from Mandya and 8 claims legendary importance because it was mythologically known as Arjunapura after the Pandava Prince who is believed to have come here on pilgrimage. In more recent authenticated history, the town suffered heavily during Tipu's wars with the British. Maddur fort, in fact, which had been fortified by Hyder, was dismantled by Lord Cornwallis in 1791.

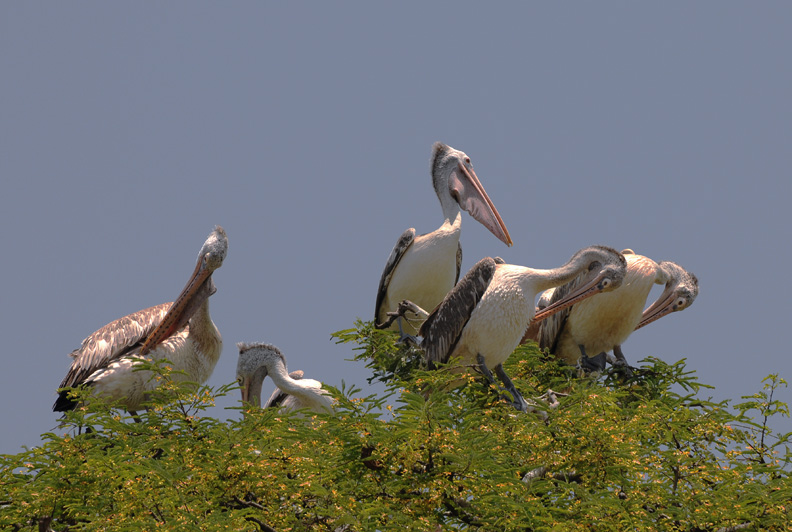
Pelicans at Kokrebellur

Among the important temples here, thankfully still existing, is the Narasirnha temple of the Hoysala period whose 7 ft high image of Ugra Narasimha made of black stone is believed to be the best of its kind in the State.

Maddur's marvelous Varadaraja temple is an early Chola or pre-Chola structure. Its 12 ft high Alialanatha deity is elaborately carved both in front and on the back with unusual features which has led to the Kannada saying 'Ella devara munde nodu Allalanathana hinde nodu' - 'All other idols are to be seen from the front but Allalanatha is to be seen from the back'.

Kokkare Bellur, is a famous bird sanctuary located in maddur taluk. Its 12 km from Maddur town.

ASI has excavated an 8th-century statue of Bahubali in Arthipura, near Chandragiri Shravanappa Betta, KM doddi, Malavalli Taluk, Maddur, Mandya, Karnataka, that is 3 ft (0.91 m) feet wide and 3.5 ft (1.1 m) tall. In 2016, Archaeological Survey of India (ASI) excavated another 13 ft (4.0 m) statue of Bahubali made in the 3rd – 9th centuries on another hillock located opposite the basadis in Arthipura. Excavation work is expected to be completed by 2018.

=== Malavalli ===
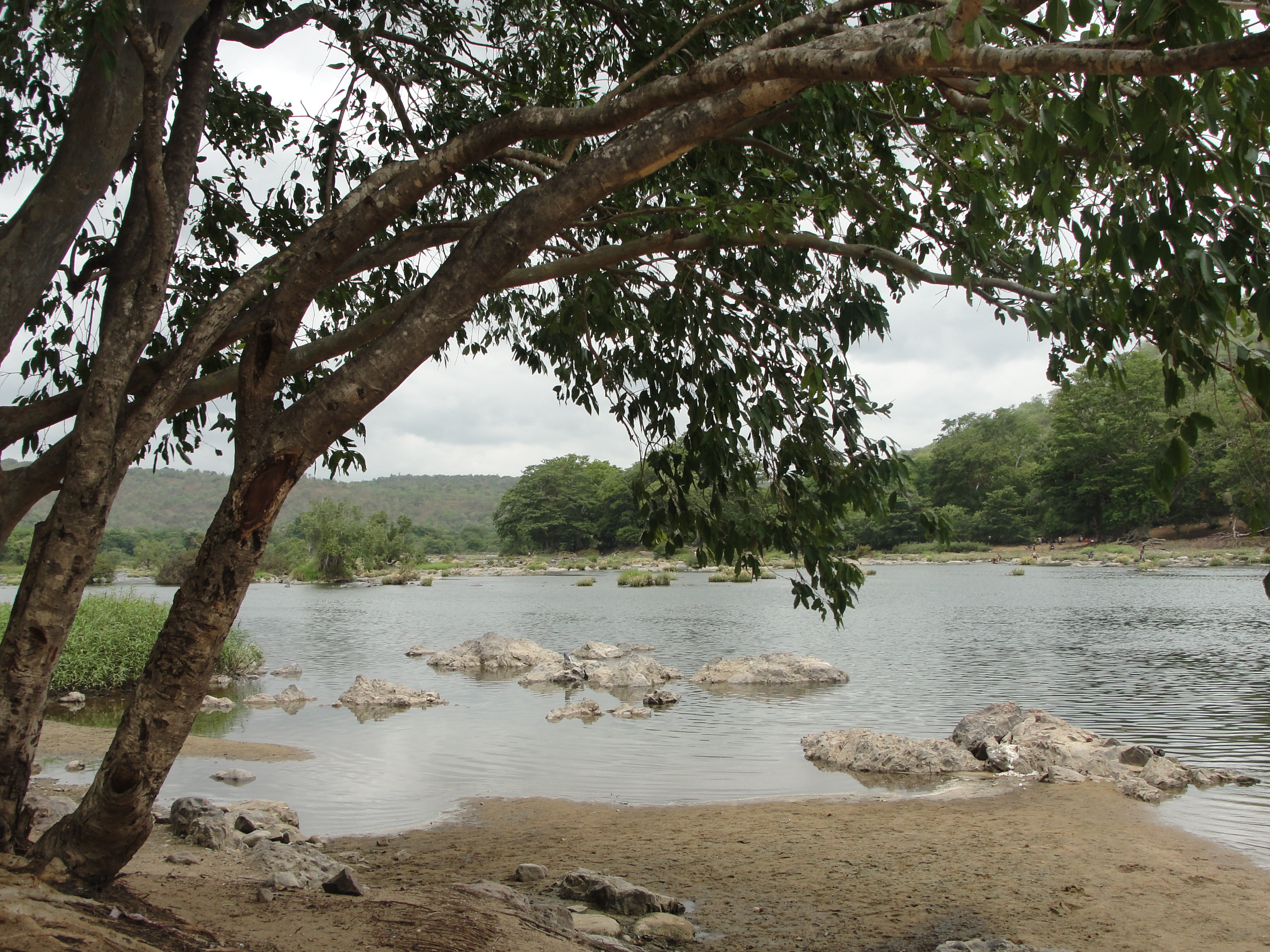
Kaveri river and sand dunes at Muthathi, Malavalli, Mandya

A historic town 37 km from Mandya which was partially destroyed by Tipu himself to prevent its being of use to the British, Malavalli is now an important centre for sericulture – a growing industry in this part of the State. Malavalli also has a flourishing leather unit.

Marehalli Sri Lakshmi Narasimha Swamy Temple, Marehalli, Malavalli Located 2 km away from Malavallli town the Marehalli Lakshmi Narasimhaswamy Temple is one among the prominent Narasimhaswamy Temples in Mandya District, belonging to the Sri Vaishnava tradition. Built during the 10th century and renovated by Raja Raja chola 1st the temple exists amidst thick greenery in an area of around 12 acres. It is believed that long ago two sages by name Suyagna and Lambakarna performed yagnas and tapasyas where the temple exists now. The lord Narasimhaswamy pleased with their devotion appeared in their dream and assured that he would reside there. The place was earlier known was Gajaranya Kshetra. The deity Narasimhaswamy swamy locally known as Marehalli Mudukappa is also known as sowmya Narasimhaswamy.

The temple complex consists of the "Amrutheshwara" temple at the entrance two mantapas on either side of the temple. Facing the main structure is the 40 feet long Garuda Gamba and Brundawana. An Anjuneyaswamy Temple at the left followed by Pathalankana and Ganesh temple are at the main entrance of the temple. The Bhoodevi and Neeladevi deities are also worshipped here. Surrounded by 108 pillars and ankanas. The Navaranga leads to the sanctum sanctorum. Of the temple called the Shukanasini Mantapa. Where the lord is seated with Goddess Lakshmi on his left lap. Prominent among the belief is that an "Amruthakalasha" lies beneath the lotus feet of Goddess Lakshmi, which when invoked with devotion fulfills all desires.

Nearby are the Shivanasamudra waterfalls, Shimsha, Cauvery Wildlife Sanctuary, Muthathi forest, Bheemeshwari Cauveri fishing camp near Halaguru., Galibore fishing camp and more
