= Halaguru =

Town in Karnataka, India

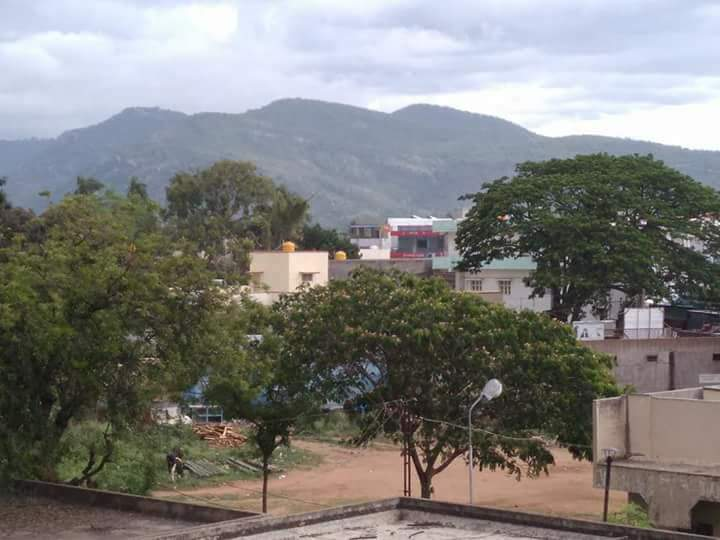
- Aerial view towards Basavana Betta.
- Nickname: Panchalgere
- Location in Karnataka, India
- Coordinates: 12.25°N 77.13°E
- Country: India
- State: Karnataka
- District: Mandya district
- Established: 1600
- Founder: Panchalas
- Talukas: Malavalli

Government
  - Type: Gram panchayat

Area
  - Total: 5.23 km^{2} (2.02 sq mi)
- Elevation: 626 m (2,054 ft)

Population (2011)
  - Total: 10,176
  - Density: 1,950/km^{2} (5,040/sq mi)
- Demonym(s): Halagurian,Halagurinavaru

Languages
  - Official: Kannada
- Time zone: UTC+5:30 (IST)
- PIN: 571421
- Vehicle registration: KA-11
- Nearest cities: Malavalli, Channapatna

Halaguru or Halagur is a town in the southern state of Karnataka, India.

== Location ==
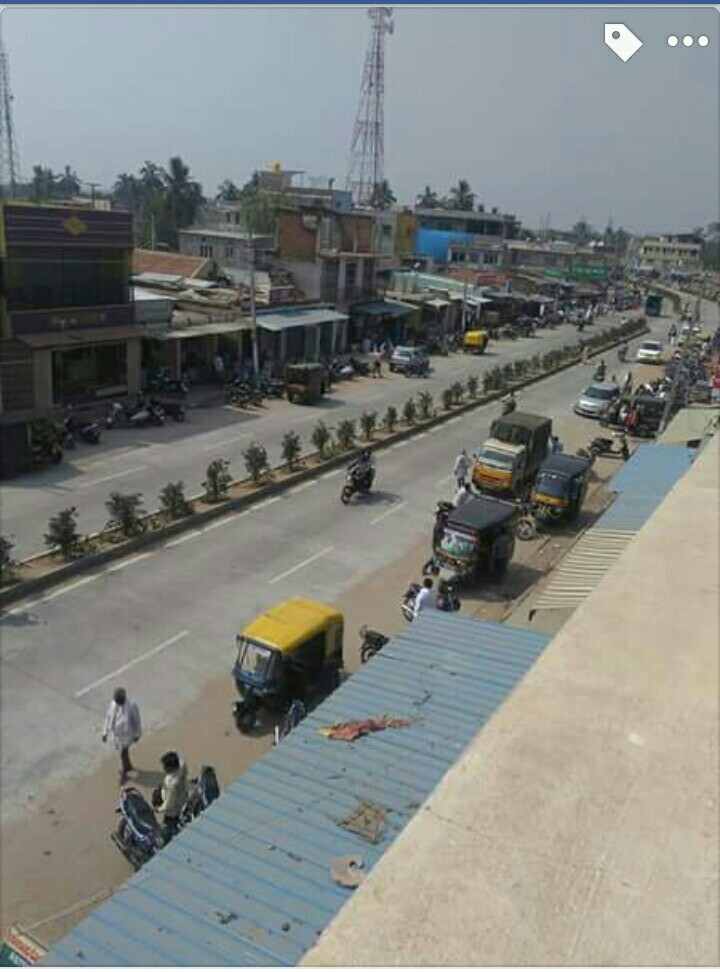
Main road in Halaguru

Halaguru is situated at NH 948 (previously NH 209) and state highway KA SH 94. It is one of the oldest towns in Mandya district. It is 82 km from Bangalore the capital city of Karnataka, 60 km from Mysore, 50 km from Mandya, 41 km from Ramanagara, 10 km from Sathanur, 27 km from Kanakapura, 29 km from Channapatna and 90 km from Chamarajanagar

== History ==
Halaguru had a history of seven great blacksmiths who had ruled the town.

== Geography ==
Halaguru is located in the Malavalli taluk of Mandya district in Karnataka. Halaguru is a major town which connects many places of Mandya and Chamarajanagara districts to Ramanagara district. It is located 27 km away from Channapatna, 28 km from Kanakapura, 22 km from Malavalli and 12 km from Sathanuru. Main river is the Shimsa river one of the tribute of Kaveri. River Kaveri is located 15 km from the town at Bheemeshwari camp. It is one of the famous tourist attractions, and also near by other tourist places are Muthathi, Kokrebellur, Kabbalu, Iggaluru Dam, Mekedaatu, Benki falls or Ganalu falls and Shivanasamudra Falls.

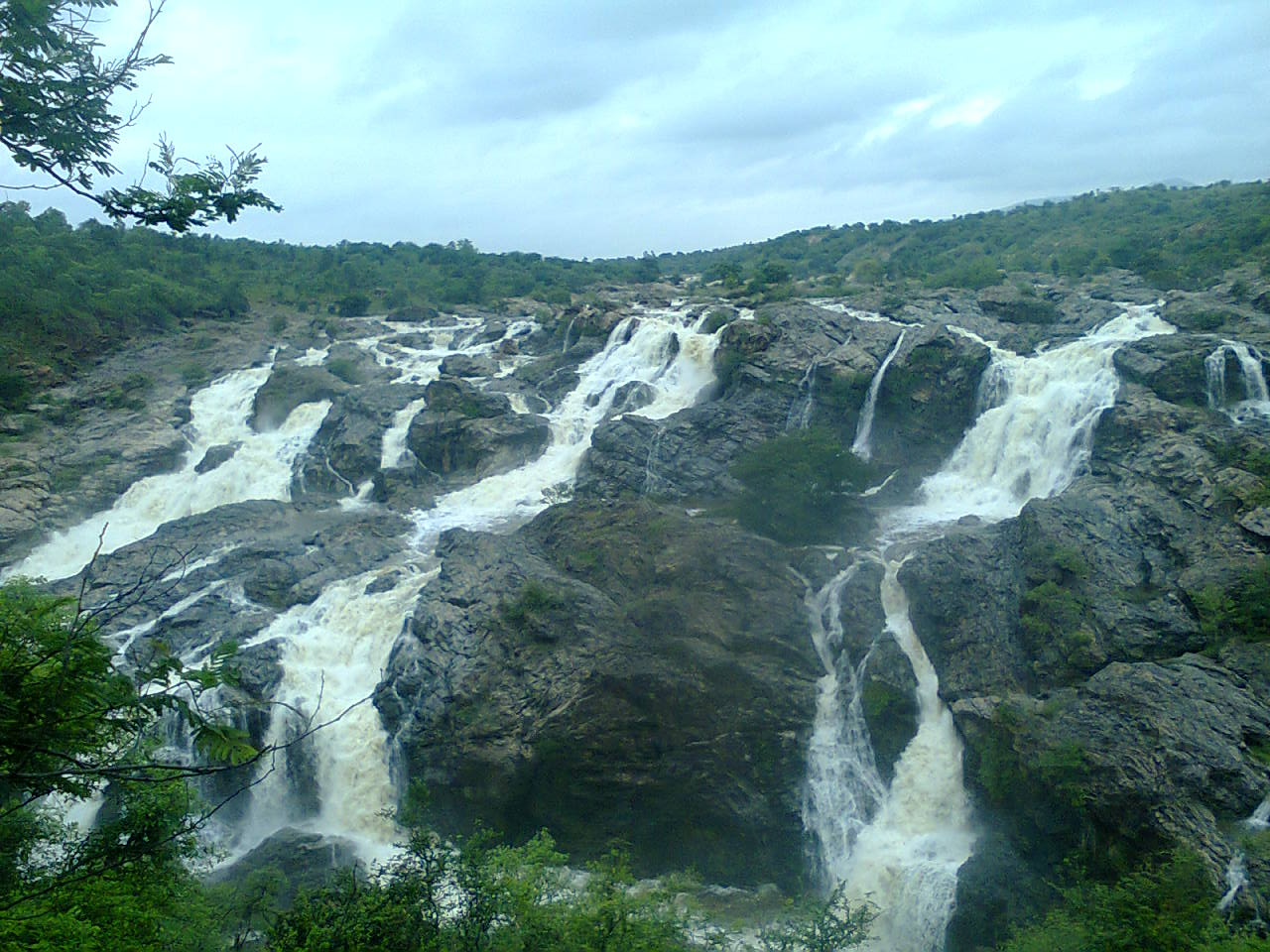
Benki falls

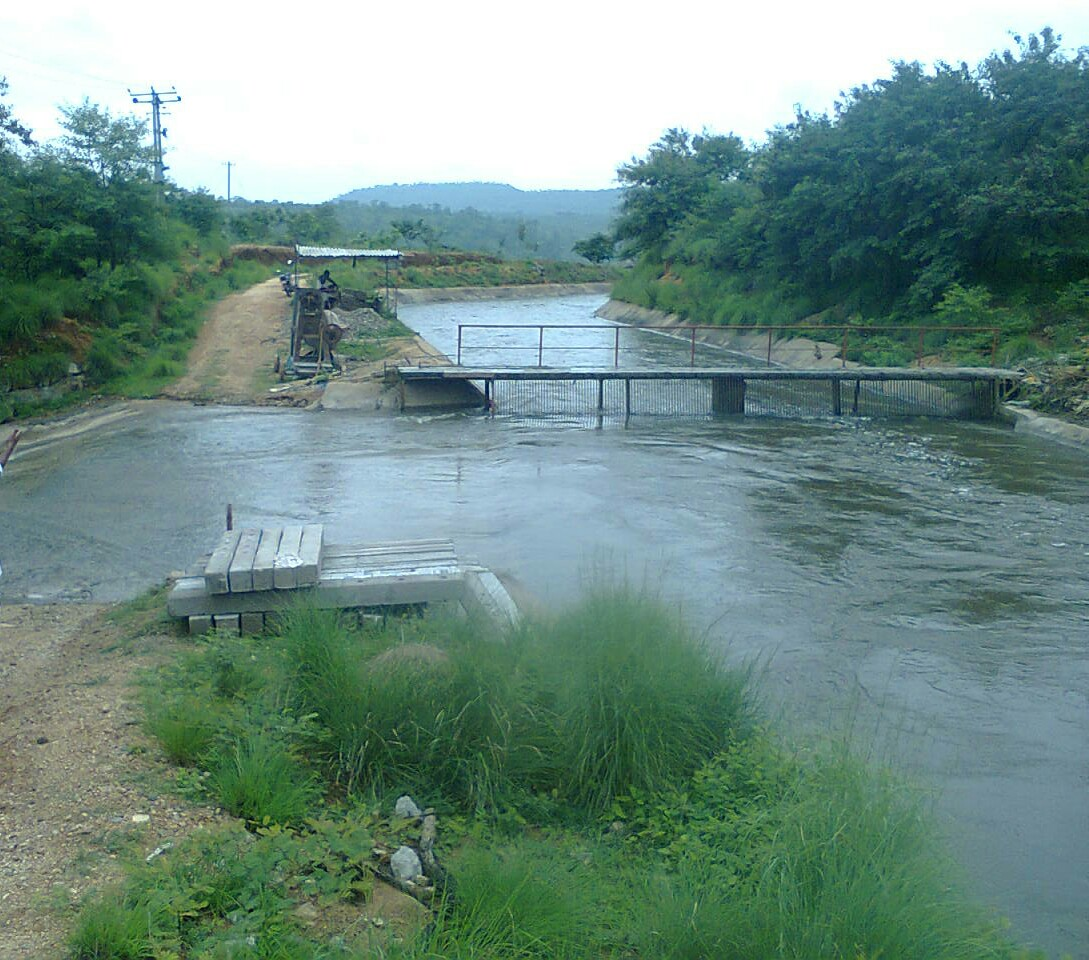
Hydro electric channel at Ganal village

== Demographics ==
As of the 2011 India census, Halaguru had a population of 10,176 comprising 5,107 males and 5,069 females giving a ratio of 993, higher than the Karnataka state average of 973. There were 1,008 children aged 0–6 i.e. 9.91% of the town's population. The literacy rate was 79.57% (males 85.58% and females 73.57%. higher than the state average of 75.36%.

== Education ==
Halaguru has both private and government institutes, including:

- Govt degree college (B.A. and B.Com.) affiliated to University of Mysore
- Govt PU college
- Govt primary and High school
- Sapthagiri English school
- Halaguru High school
- JPM School
- JJ Public School
- Good Shepherd School
- Divya Jyothi School
- Huwad School
