= Agasanapura =

- village
- Interactive map of Agasanapura
- Coordinates: 12.4292°N 77.1270°E
- Country: India
- State: Karnataka
- District: Mandya
- Talukas: Malavalli

Government
  - Body: Village Panchayat

Languages
  - Official: Kannada
- Time zone: UTC+5:30 (IST)
- Nearest city: Mandya
- Civic agency: Village Panchayat

Agasanapura is a village in the southern state of Karnataka, India. It is located in the Malavalli taluk of Mandya district in Karnataka.

== See also ==
- Mandya
- Districts of Karnataka
