= Kodena Koppalu =

Kodhena Koppalu
- village
- Country: India
- State: Karnataka
- District: Mandya
- Taluk: Malavalli
- Elevation: 665 m (2,182 ft)

Languages
  - Official: Kannada
- Time zone: UTC+5:30 (IST)

Kodhena Koppalu is a small village with rich agricultural lands and human resources in Malavalli taluk in Mandya district, Mysore division in Karnataka, India. in which more than 90% literacy rate. It is located 27 km east of Mandya,39 km From Mysore and 102 km from the state capital Bangalore.

== Colleges ==
- Bharathi PU College Kirugavalu
- Shanthi College Malavalli
- Govt degree College Maliyuru (Bannur)

== Schools ==
- Government higher primary school Kodena Koppalu
- GHS Kirugavalu
- Chaitra high school
- Adarsha convent
- Jnana Ganga convent
- Rotary school
- Gokula convent
