= Cauvery Wildlife Sanctuary =

Protected area in India

- Bheemeshwari Wildlife Sanctuary
- IUCN category IV (habitat/species management area)
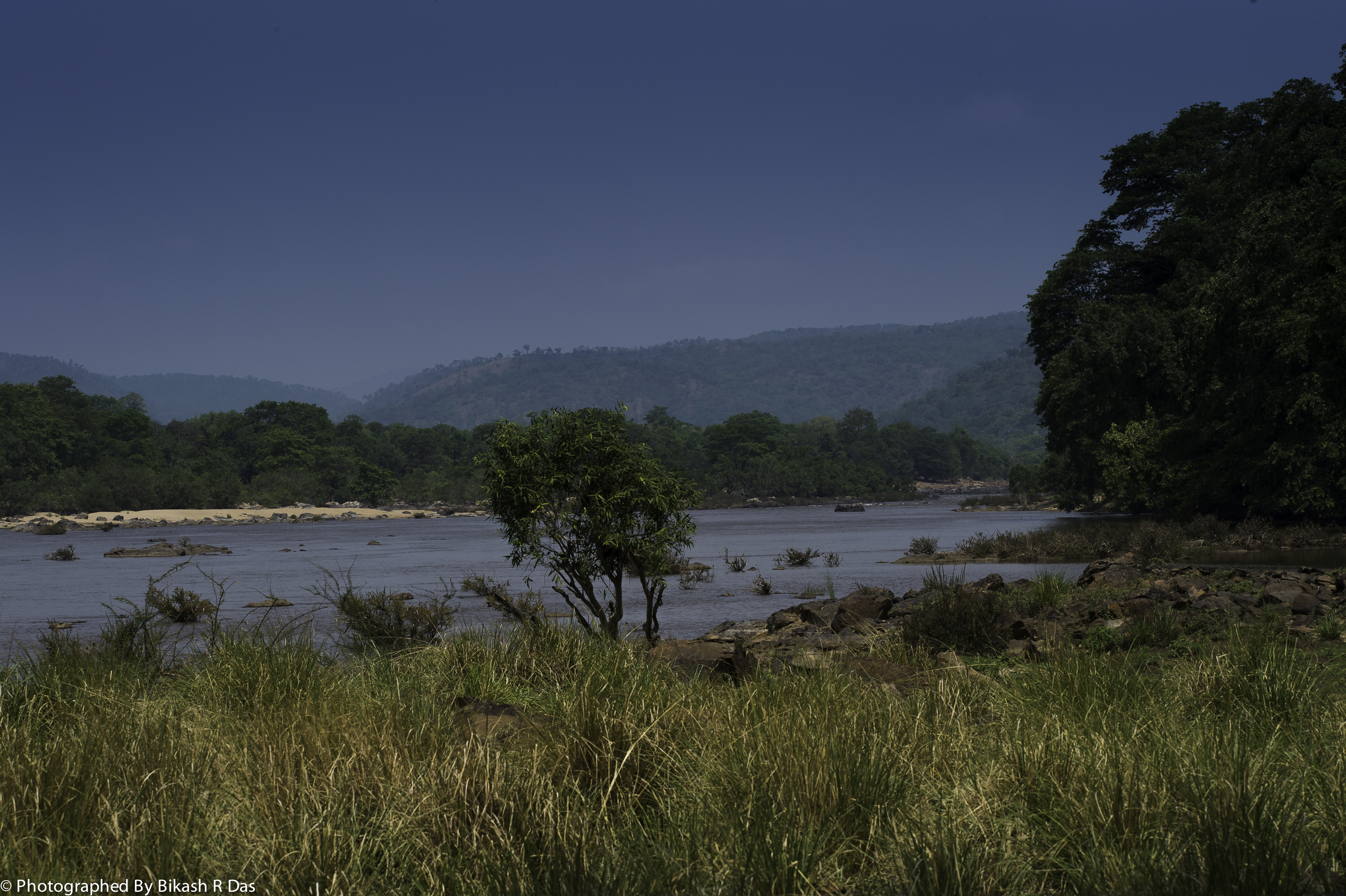
- A view of Cauvery Wildlife Sanctuary

- Location within Karnataka Location within India
- Interactive map of Cauvery Wildlife Sanctuary
- Location: Karnataka, India
- Nearest city: Mandya
- Coordinates: 12.170°N 77.543°E
- Area: 1,027.53 km^{2} (396.73 sq mi)
- Established: 1987
- Governing body: Government of India, MOEF, Karnataka Forest Department

Cauvery Wildlife Sanctuary is a wildlife sanctuary in the Mandya, Chamarajanagar and Bengaluru South districts of Karnataka, India. The Cauvery River passes through its midst. An area of 510.52 km^{2} (197.11 sq mi) was established as Cauvery Wildlife Sanctuary on 14 January 1987 under Section 18 of the Wildlife Protection Act 1972 with the objective of providing protection, conservation and development of Wildlife and its environment. The sanctuary was expanded to its current area of 102,753 ha (253,910 acres) in 2013. On its east, it adjoins Dharmapuri forest division of Tamil Nadu.

== Geography ==
Cauvery Wildlife Sanctuary established on 14 January 1987 under Section 18 of the Wildlife Protection Act 1973, is spread over an area of 1,027.53 km^{2} (396.73 sq mi) It lies in an elevation range of 125–1,514 m (410–4,967 ft) ("Ponnachi Betta" is the highest mountain in the centre of the sanctuary) with its northern and southern boundary delimited by the Cauvery River on the Eastern Ghats, which drains from west to east. Its eastern and northeastern borders are bounded by the Tamil Nadu state. The river forms the interstate boundary between Karnataka and Tamil Nadu states over a river reach of 73 km (45 mi) with dense forests on both banks. The sanctuary is named after the Cauvery River which flows through it over a total length of 101 km (63 mi).

Important places along the river stretch flowing through the sanctuary covering its forested central and eastern parts are the Hogenakal Falls (meaning: "smoking rock" in Kannada language), Mekedatu (meaning: "goats leap"), and Sangam (confluence with the Arkavathi River. An important religious centre within the sanctuary is Muthathi Anjaneya temple. Also located within the sanctuary are an ecotourism fishing resort and the Cauvery Fishing Camp at Bhimeshwari.

Cauvery Wildlife Sanctuary is managed by the Deputy Conservator of Forests with four wildlife ranges at Kanakapura, Hanur, Cowdally and MM Hills wildlife ranges. The reserve forests, which are part of the sanctuary, are Basavanabetta S.F with 3,765.50 ha (9,304.8 acres), Chilandavadi S.F with 1,987.50 ha (4,911.2 acres), Muggur S.F 2,044.00 ha (5,050.8 acres), Chikkayalur S.F 13,875.00 ha (34,285.9 acres), and Mahadeswara Reserve Forest (31,023.50 ha (76,660.7 acres). The boundary of the sanctuary is well demarcated with the surrounding border areas consisting of agricultural lands and forests; the bordering forest areas are: the Kollegal forest division to its west and south, Mandya and Ramanagaram forest divisions to its north, and Dharmapuri Forest division of Tamil Nadu state to its east. Human habitation inside the sanctuary and within 5 km (3.1 mi) radius of the sanctuary consists of eight enclosed villages and 30 villages respectively with a total population of 39,000 whose main occupation is agriculture. Along the boundary of the sanctuary, a trench is excavated to prevent elephant migration to neighbouring villages and to check damage to agricultural lands.

== Climate ==
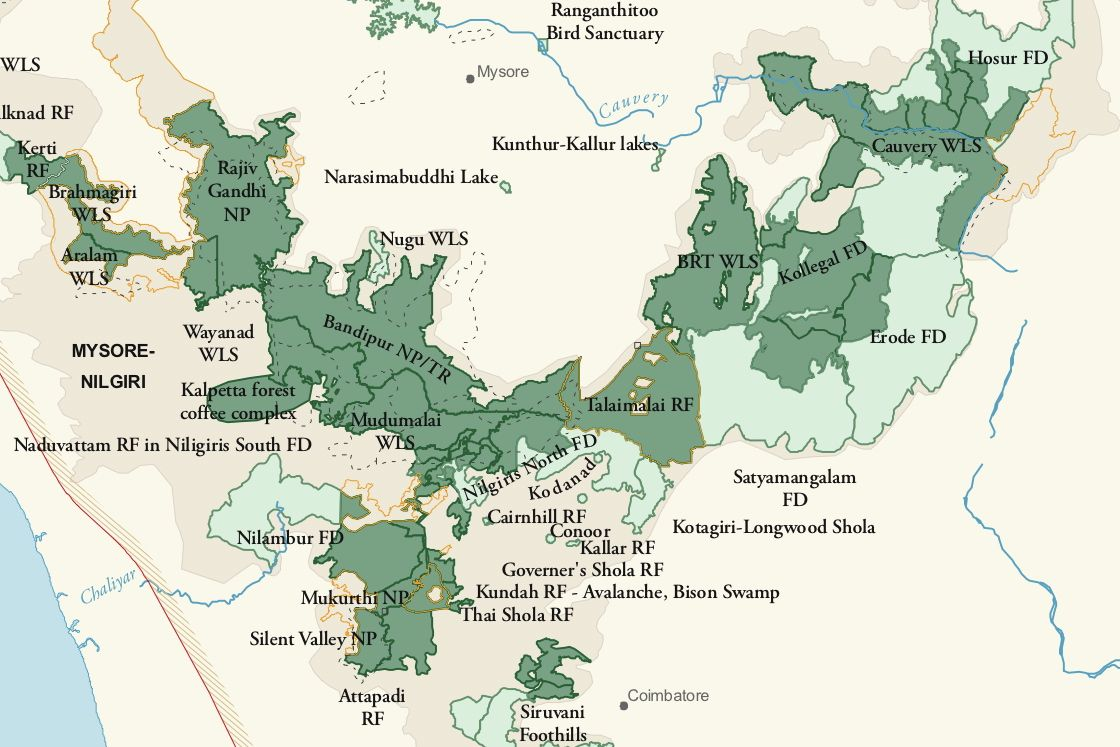
Map showing Cauvery Wildlife Sanctuary

The sanctuary has a semi-arid climate, where the average temperatures are a minimum of 5 °C (41 °F) and maximum of 38 °C (100 °F), and during summer it touches a maximum of 40 °C (104 °F). The sanctuary receives rainfall both during the Northeast monsoon and Southwest monsoon. The rainfall varies between 750 mm (30 in) and 800 mm (31 in).

== Biology and ecology ==
The sanctuary mainly consists of dry deciduous forest, southern tropical dry thorn and riverine forests. Hardwickia binata and Albizia amara are the dominant forest types. There is hardly any vegetation in the northwestern part while good forests exist in the rest of the sanctuary.

=== Flora ===
The dominant species of trees found in this sanctuary are Terminalia arjuna and jambul (Syzygium cumini). Other tree species in the sanctuary are Albizia amara, Feronia sp., Tamarindus indica, Mangifera indica, Hardwickia binata, Acacia armata, and several other species of acacia, Feronia and Ficus.

=== Fauna ===
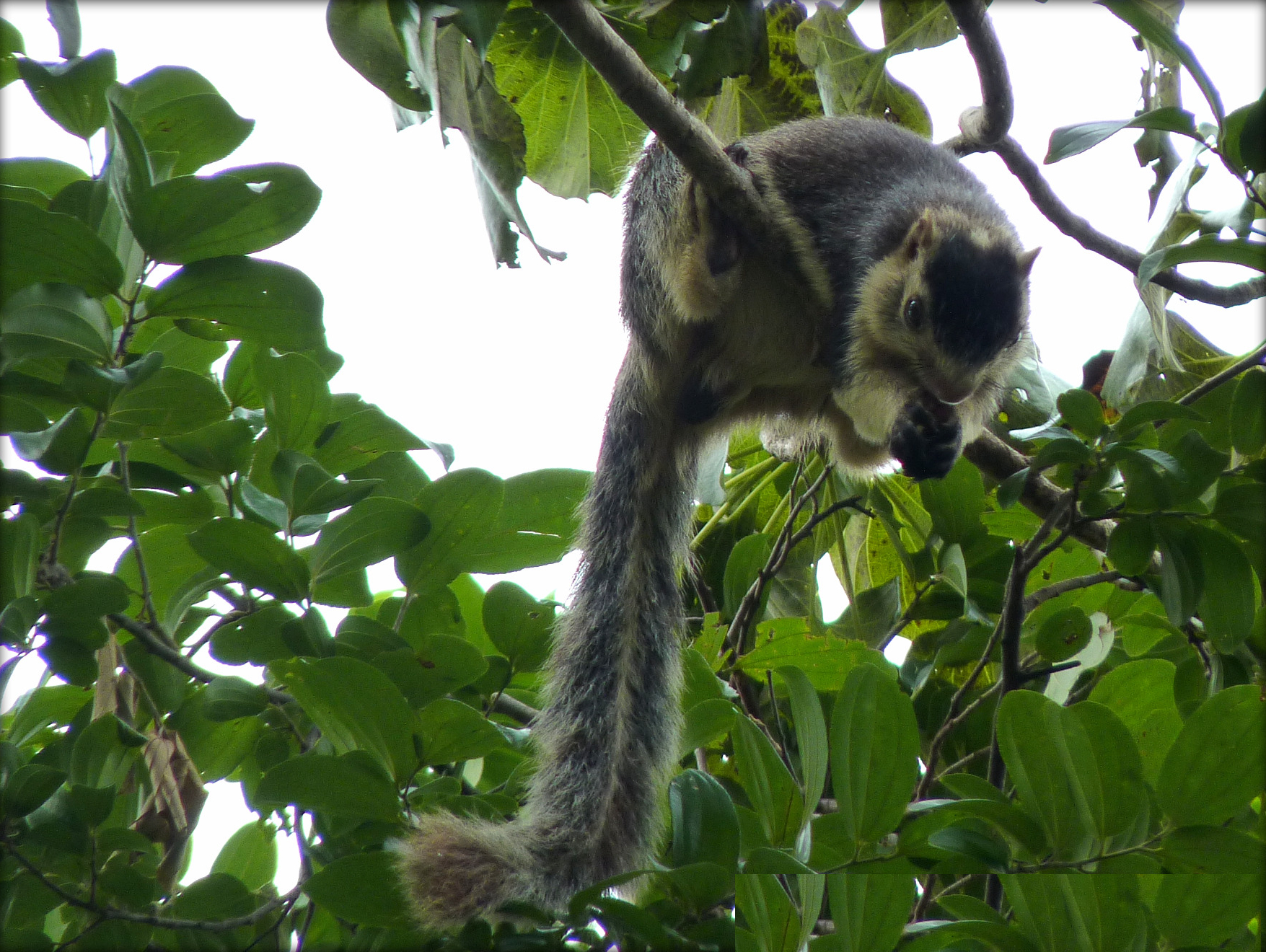
Grizzled giant squirrel in the Cauvery Wildlife Sanctuary

It is home to mammals like the Bengal tiger (Panthera tigris), Indian elephant (Elephas maximus), wild boar (Sus scrofa), Indian leopard (Panthera pardus),Sloth bear (Melursus ursinus), dhole, spotted deer (Axis axis), barking deer (Muntiacus muntjak), sambar (Cervus unicolor), four-horned antelope (Tetracerus quadricornis), black-naped hare (Lepus nigricollis), chevrotain, common langur, bonnet macaque, honey badger, Indian giant squirrel (Ratufa indica maxima), grizzled giant squirrel (Ratufa macroura) The smooth-coated otter sites in the sanctuary's river reach were specifically studied. It was noted that the otters inhabited riverine areas which were loosely packed sand and rock without compacted sand, rocks, gravel, and plant cover.

The river Cauvery is also habitat for various species of reptiles like the mugger crocodile (Crocodylus palustris), Indian mud turtles (Chelonia sp.). Reptile species in the sanctuary are Indian rock python (Python molurus), Indian cobra (Naja naja), Russell's viper (Daboia russelii) and banded krait (Bungarus fasciatus). This is also one of the few places to find the hump-backed mahseer Tor remadevii).

=== Avifauna ===
The sanctuary is listed as an IBA assessed bird area by the BirdLife International in 2004 which extends over the same semiarid area as the sanctuary. The two most endangered species in the sanctuary are Gyps species of vultures – the white-rumped vulture (Gyps bengalensis) and Indian vulture (Gyps indicus). The four vulnerable species reported are Nilgiri wood-pigeon (Columba elphinstonii), greater spotted eagle (Clanga clanga), white-naped tit (Parus nuchalis) and yellow-throated bulbul (Pycnonotus xantholaemus). Other bird species reported are 25 species of Malayan Tropical Dry Zone which includes the near threatened red-headed vulture (Sarcogyps calvus). Some notable resident species here include brown boobook (Ninox scutulata), white-bellied blue-flycatcher (Cyornis pallipes), stork-billed kingfisher (Pelagorpsis capensis), green imperial-pigeon (Ducula aenea) and Indian scops-owl (Otus bakkamoena).

In a recent bird survey carried out in the sanctuary, reported in January 2014, the total number of bird species identified in the park are 280, which include 19 new species. Some of the notable species reported are: Indian courser, Malabar parakeet, large-billed leaf warbler, green leaf-warbler, western crowned leaf warbler, fairy-bluebird, the Indian blue robin, the yellow-throated bulbul, the crested goshawk, rosefinch, Blyth's swift, Orphean warbler, European bee-eater, and Eurasian crag martin.

There is a very notable, disjunct population of lesser fish-eagles in the sanctuary. This species is harder to find elsewhere across peninsular India.

== Threats ==
The threats faced in the sanctuary have been recorded to be mostly of recent origin and of low intensity. These low level threats are related to farming and fishing activities, use of forest resources in the form of logging, tree harvesting, extraction of minor forest produce, least degree of recreational disturbance from human activities and low level of natural changes in the form of water harvesting structures. Upstream water impoundments have resulted in very low flows even in monsoon seasons, and dam releases introduce cold, low mineral content water at unpredictable times, all of which impact on riverine species. Still, the threats from exploitation of biological resources in the form of hunting and capture of animals is assessed as high.

However, a damming project proposed at Mekedatu now comes as the biggest threat, as it would flood 12,000 acres of forest land, with 7,800 acres of land under the Cauvery Wildlife Sanctuary. This could severely impact the only large population of grizzled giant-squirrels in Karnataka and dwindle the already endangered population of the humpback mahseers and other fish endemic to this shallow riverine habitat. It could as well increase man-animal conflict in the forest regions north and south of the sanctuary, as the region is a vital elephant and tiger corridor.

Introductions of alien fish species have put huge pressures on the native fish, especially the most endangered species.

== Conservation measures ==
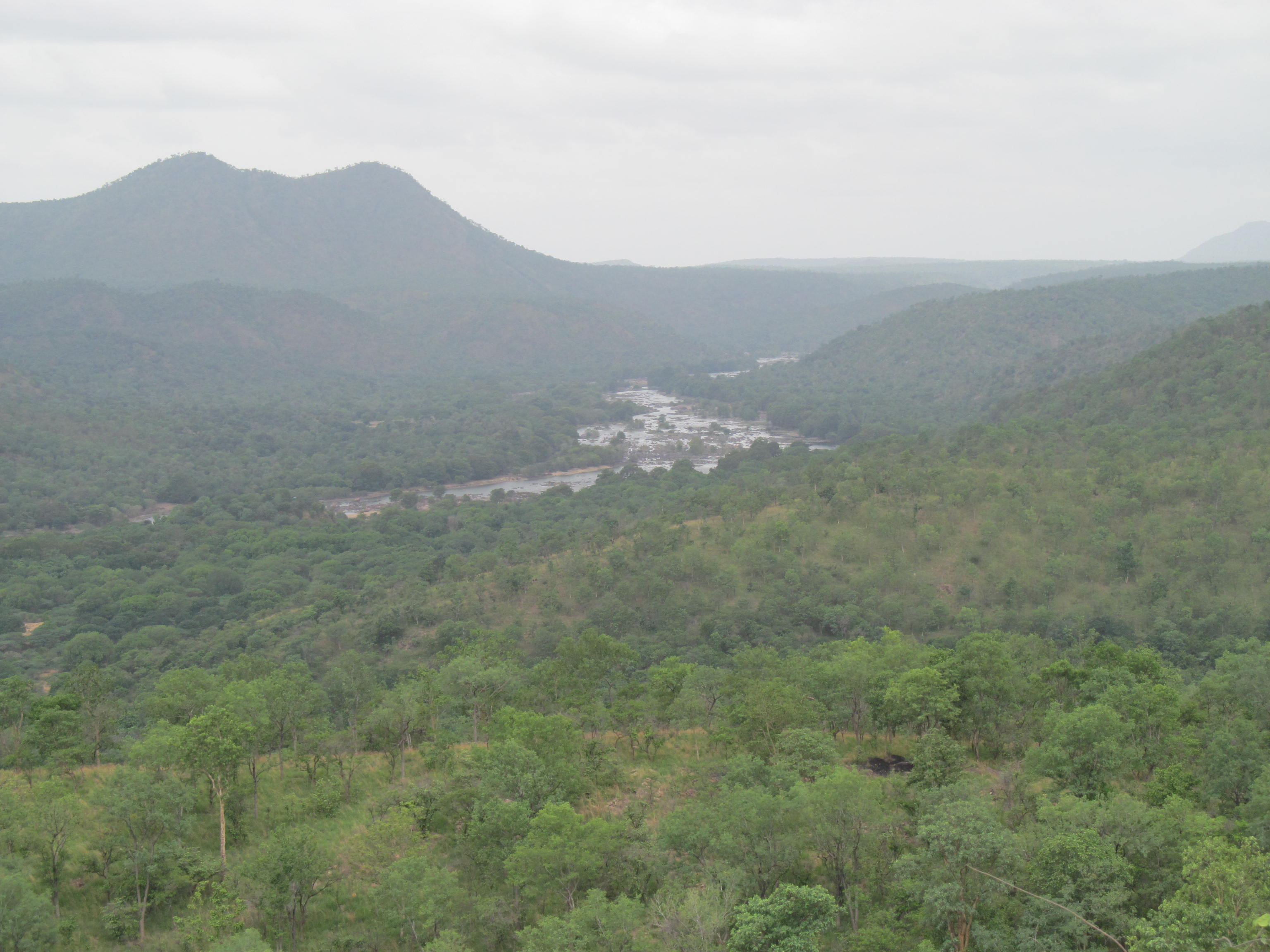
Cauvery Wildlife Sanctuary landscape

Conservation measures in force in the sanctuary are in the form of patrolling on foot and in jeeps, and functioning of 11 moving anti-poaching camps; two permanent camps have been proposed. Drinking water to wild animals are provided through building of water conservation structures. Fire lines are cut and burnt well in advance before the beginning of the forest fire season; fire lines are created and dry material burnt. Fire watchers are stationed at strategic locations.

A 10-year conservation plan for the period 2006–16 has been instituted. Zoning of forest into Core, Buffer, and Tourism zones has been planned. The tourism zone has four specific areas – Bheemeshwari and Muthathi, Sangam and Mekedatu in the Kanakapura Wildlife Range, Gopinatham and Hogenakal falls of M.M.Hills Wildlife Range. Administrative set up has been proposed to be reorganized with additional staff. Improvement of patrolling paths has been envisaged. To increase awareness among the general public publicity pamphlets are planned, apart from fixing signages and plaques with information on the importance of preservation of wildlife of the sanctuary.
