= Mellahalli =

- village
- Country: India
- State: Karnataka
- District: Mandya
- Talukas: Maddur

Government
  - Body: Gram panchayat

Population (2001)
  - Total: 5,945

Languages
  - Official: Kannada
- Time zone: UTC+5:30 (IST)
- ISO 3166 code: IN-KA
- Vehicle registration: KA
- Website: karnataka.gov.in

Mellahalli is a village in the southern state of Karnataka, India. It is located in the Maddur taluk of Mandya district in Karnataka.

== Demographics ==
As of the 2011 census, Mellahalli had a population of 6393, which was an increase from the 5945 (3192 males and 2753 females) that was recorded in 2001.

== Location ==
Mellahalli is located between Maddur and Malavalli.
