= Maddur railway bridge collapse =

India disaster

The Maddur railway bridge is a bridge in India. It is located between Mysore and Maddur, in the state of Karnataka.

The Mysore State Railway crossed the River Shimsha.

== Duplication ==
In 2014, the single track railway was duplicated. Two new concrete railway bridges were constructed and the old steel bridge placed out of use. Having two new single track bridges, separated by about a metre, rather than one double track bridge is more robust, since a problem affecting one single track bridge is less likely (though not guaranteed) to affect the other single track bridge. The separate spans also allow rail-mounted cranes on the surviving bridge to get close to clear debris on the affected track, a problem with the Nzi River bridge collapse. The new bridges are likely to allow increased axle loads and speeds. The old and new bridges are about 50m apart, and the new bridge seem to be at a higher level than the old one. The new bridges are 1,676 mm (5 ft 6 in) gauge.

== Collapse ==
On or before 26 September 1897, the bridge collapsed due to the river it crossed being in flood. Five of the fully loaded carriages fell into the river and about 150 people drowned.

== See also ==
- List of bridge failures
