= Kirugavalu =

Village in Karnataka, South India, India

Coordinates: 12°22′N 76°57′E

- village
- Kirugavalu
- Nickname: ಕಿರುಗಾವಲು
- Interactive map of Kirugavalu
- Country: India
- State: Karnataka
- District: Mandya
- Named for: Indians
- Talukas: Malavalli

Government
  - Type: Indians
  - Body: Bharatiya Janata Party

Population (2017)
  - Total: 13,456

Languages
  - Official: ಕನ್ನಡ kannada
- Time zone: UTC+5:30 (IST)

Kirugavalu is a village in the southern state of Karnataka, India. Kirugavalu is located in the Malavalli taluk of Mandya district in Karnataka.

Kirugavalu is a village located on the Mysore–Malavalli highway in Karnataka, India. It is situated approximately 40 km from Mysore.

Kirugavalu has several Hindu temples, including the Shiva Temple, Kalikamba Temple, Ganesha Temple, and Maramma Temple.

== Demographics ==
As of 2001 India census, Kirugavalu had a population of 7859 with 4059 males and 3800 females.

== See also ==
- Mandya
- Districts of Karnataka
