= Shimsha =

Tributary of Kaveri river

Shimsha River
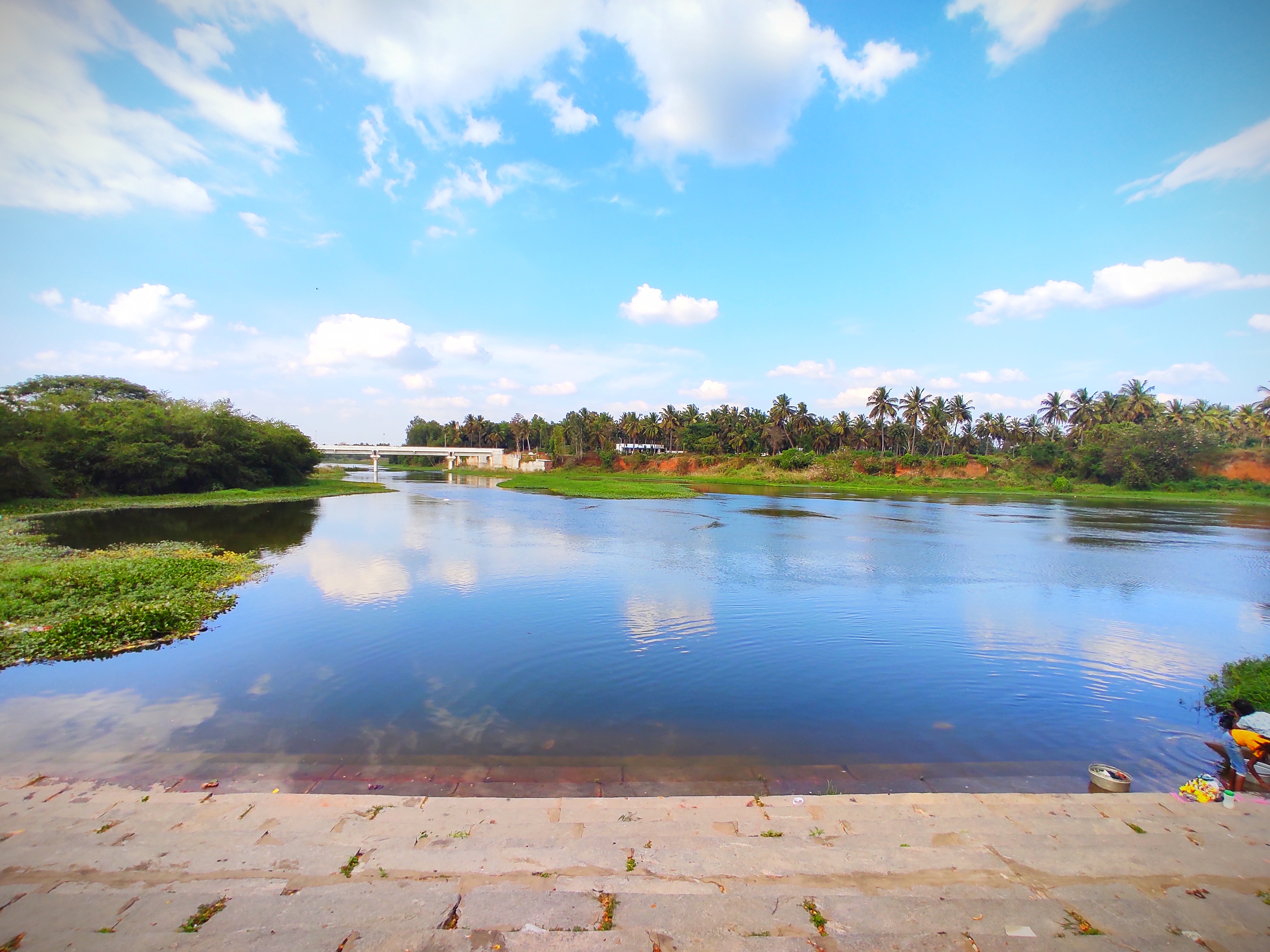
- The Shimsha river, flowing in Maddur

Location
- Country: India
- State: Karnataka

Physical characteristics
- Source: Devarayanadurga hills
  - location: Tumkur, Karnataka, India
- Mouth: Kaveri River
  - location: Chamarajanagar, India
  - coordinates: 12°18′40″N 77°14′18″E
- Length: 221 km (137 mi)approx.

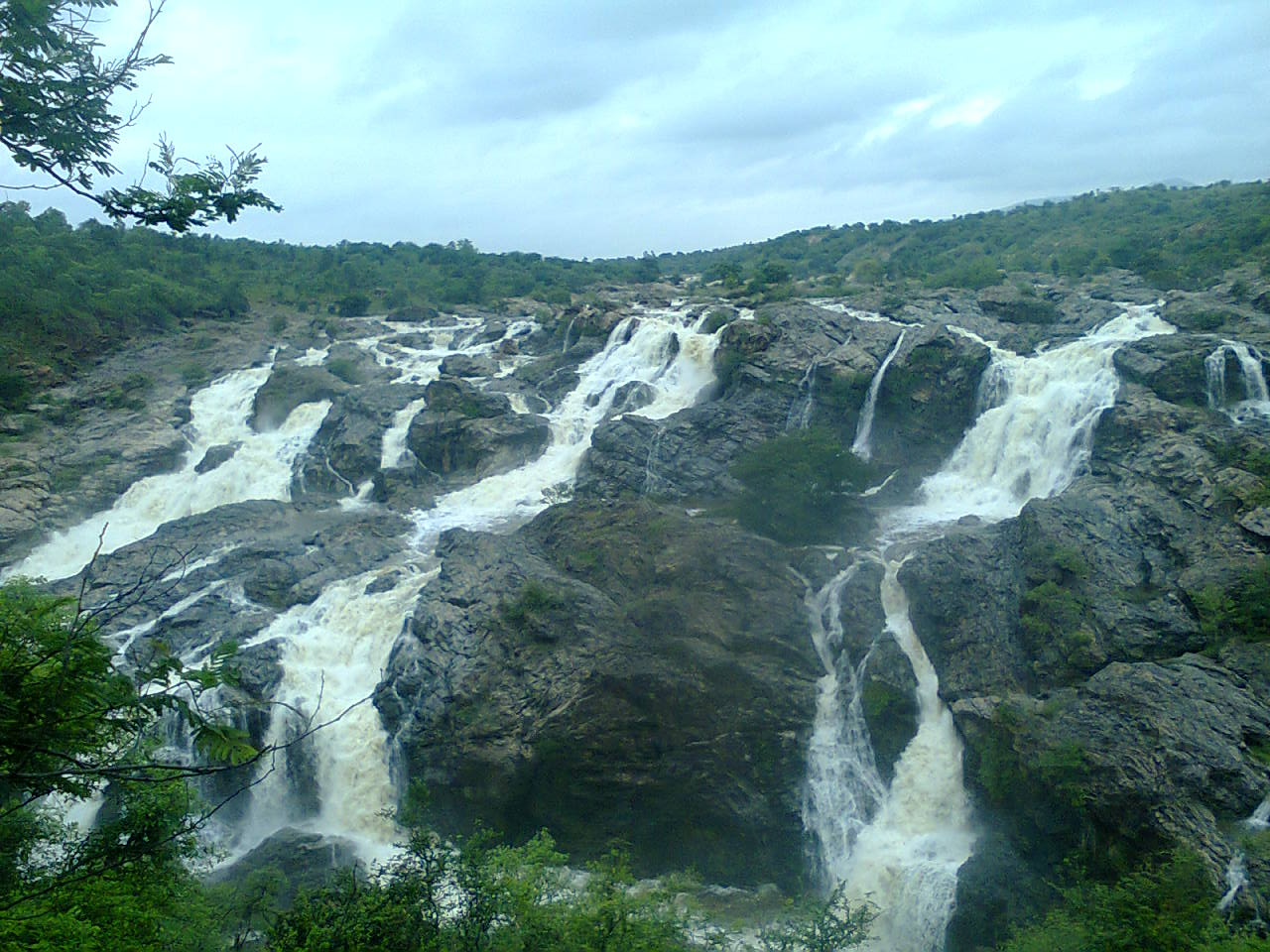
Ganalu Falls is located approximately 7.3 km from the confluence with the Kaveri.

Shimsha is a river that flows in the state of Karnataka, India. It is one of the tributaries of the river Kaveri, which is one of the major rivers of South India. The river originates in the southern part of the Devarayanadurga hill in the Tumkur district of Karnataka and flows for about 221 km (137 mi) in Mandya and Bengaluru South districts before joining the river Kaveri.

== Geography ==
Origin

Shimsha originates at an altitude of 914 m in the Devarayanadurga hill located in Tumakuru Taluk which is also the location of two temples of the Hindu God, Narasimha.

Course

After originating in the Tumkur district, The Markonahalli Dam has been built across it, the river takes a southerly course and enters the Mandya district. In Mandya district, the river flows in a south-eastern direction and enters the Bengaluru South district where HD Devegowda barriage is constructed in the Village of Iggaluru, Channapatna, which provides water for irrigation of Channapatna and Malavalli talukas. Then it enters Malavalli taluk where it has awaterfall at Shimshapura. Just after Shimshapura it reaches the border of Chamarajanagar district where it joins the river Kaveri. The confluence of Shimsha and Kaveri is also near the Shivanasamudra falls. The total length of the river is 221 km (137 mi). and the river has a catchment area of 8469 km^{2}.

Sub-tributaries

In its course the river is joined by Kanva river near Saraguru,Channapatna and other streams such as Veeravaishnavi, Kanihalla, Chikkahole, Hebbahalla and Mullahalla.

Towns and cities

Maddur and Halaguru are the major towns that lie on this river.

== Dams ==
Markonahalli Dam

Markonahalli Dam is a dam built across the river Shimsha in the Kunigal Taluk of Tumkur district. It was built by Krishnaraja Wodeyar IV, the king of Mysore under the guidance of his Diwan, Sir M Visweswaraiah. It was built to irrigate 6070 hectares of land and has a masonry structure of 139 m and a pair of earth dams extending to 1470 metres on either side. The reservoir has a catchment area of 4,103 km^{2} (1,584 sq mi) and can hold a volume of 68,000,000 cubic metres (2.4×10^{9} ft^{3}) of water at a full reservoir level of 731.57 m above the mean sea level. 27 species of fish, including 13 species of commercial fishes have been recorded in the reservoir with Puntius being the dominant species of fish found here. Cirrhinus reba and Labeo calbasu and other transplanted carps are also found here. However, the maintenance of the dam has been poor. In 2000, a part of the dam had to be demolished to prevent floods and save 25 villages. Water started overflowing the dam and only 1 crest gate could be opened. Nearly 150 feet of the dam was demolished to allow excess water to flow out.

Iggaluru Dam

Iggaluru Dam, also known as the Iggaluru Barrage, is constructed across the Shimsha River in Iggaluru, Channapatna. The dam stands at a height of 60 feet (18.29 meters) and features a composite structure with a central masonry spillway flanked by earthen sections.It provides water for irrigational purpose in Channapatna and Malavalli taluks.

== Power generation ==
Shimsha has a waterfall at Shimshapura in Malavalli Taluk. This is also the location of the Shimsha Hydro Electric Project which has an installed capacity of 17,200 kilowatts. The plant was established in December 1937 to augment power supply of the Shivanasamudra Project (1902). The foundation stone for project was laid by Krishnaraja Wodeyar IV, the king of Mysore.

== Issues ==
=== Sand mining ===
The sand found on the river bed of the Shimsha river is mined and used for construction activities, sometimes illegally. Due to the environmental issues that can be caused by sand mining, this activity is currently banned.

=== Pollution ===
Discharge of waste from towns and cities on the way are major contributors to pollution in the Shimsha. However, the Government is trying to clean up the river and has released funds for the same.

== See also ==
- Pharping Hydro Power Project

== Accidents ==
In 1897, a railway bridge over this river collapsed during a heavy flood, killing about 150 passengers.
