= Alada Halli, Malavalli =

Alada Halli
- village
- Alada Halli, Malavalli is in Mandya district
- Country: India
- State: Karnataka
- District: Mandya
- Talukas: Malavalli

Government
  - Body: Village Panchayat

Languages
  - Official: Kannada
- Time zone: UTC+5:30 (IST)
- Nearest city: Mandya
- Civic agency: Village Panchayat

Alada Halli is a village in the southern state of Karnataka, India. It is located in the Malavalli taluk of Mandya district in Karnataka.

== See also ==
- Districts of Karnataka
- Mandya
