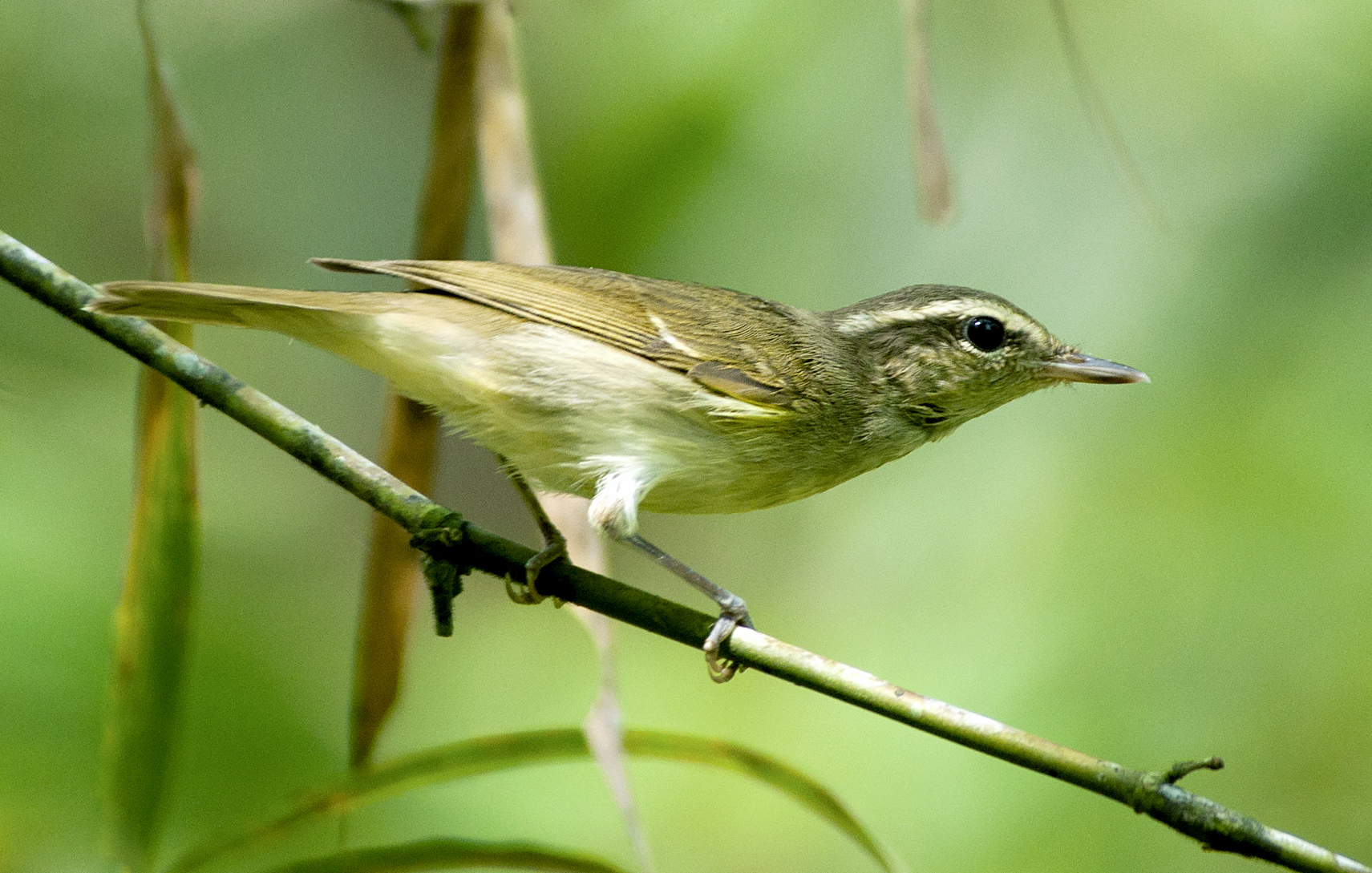

Conservation status
- Least Concern (IUCN 3.1)

Scientific classification
- Kingdom: Animalia
- Phylum: Chordata
- Class: Aves
- Order: Passeriformes
- Family: Phylloscopidae
- Genus: Phylloscopus
- Species: P. magnirostris

Binomial name
- Phylloscopus magnirostris Blyth, 1843

Audio
- Call

= Large-billed leaf warbler =

Species of bird

The large-billed leaf warbler (Phylloscopus magnirostris) is a species of migratory leaf warbler (family Phylloscopidae) found in Asia.

This is a somewhat large leaf warbler with a single wing bar and a prominent yellowish-whitesupercilium. A contrasting broad and dark eye stripe extending behind the eye, a large darkish upper mandible and a distinctive call set it apart from most other leaf warblers in its range. It has a dark crown and greyish ear-coverts. It can be confused with an Arctic warbler.

- - - - - - - borealis
            - examinandus
          - xanthodryas
        - - tenellipes
          - borealoides
      - magnirostris
    - emeiensis
  - - - trochiloides
      - plumbeitarsus
    - nitidus

Nearest relatives of P. magnirostris based on a 2018 study

Breeding in central China and the Himalayas, it winters in Sri Lanka, the Western Ghats and associated hill ranges. It is found in dense vegetation. It has also been observed in urban areas on occasion.

It is more often heard than seen. The two note dir-tee call with the second note much higher is distinctive. Another call is a single faint note followed by a series of paired-notes descending evenly. They call often and at regular intervals.
