= Somanathapura, Mandya =

Somanathapura
- village
- Location in Karnataka, India
- Coordinates: 12°34′41.6″N 76°26′48.7″E
- Country: India
- State: Karnataka
- District: Mandya district

Government
  - Body: Grama Panchayat

Population
  - Total: 836

Languages
  - Official: Kannada
- Time zone: UTC+5:30 (IST)
- ISO 3166 code: IN-KA
- Vehicle registration: KA
- Nearest city: Mysore
- Website: karnataka.gov.in

Somanathapura, is a village in Krishnarajapet, Mandya district in the state of Karnataka in India. It is located 58 kilometres (36 mi) from Mysore city.

== Demographics ==
According to the 2011 Indian Census, the town consists of 836 people. The town has a literacy rate of 78.11 percent which is higher than Karnataka's average of 75.36 percent.

Total Number of Household : 207
Population	Persons	Males	Females
Total	836	417	419
In the age group 0–6 years	61	32	29
Scheduled Castes (SC)	173	85	88
Scheduled Tribes (ST)	0	0	0
Literates	653	350	303
Illiterate	183	67	116
Total Worker	391	276	115
Main Worker	268	222	46
Main Worker - Cultivator	123	120	3
Main Worker - Agricultural Labourers	70	42	28
Main Worker - Household Industries	4	2	2
Main Worker - Other	71	58	13
Marginal Worker	123	54	69
Marginal Worker - Cultivator	7	5	2
Marginal Worker - Agriculture Labourers	112	46	66
Marginal Worker - Household Industries	1	0	1
Marginal Workers - Other	3	3	0
Marginal Worker (3-6 Months)	121	53	68
Marginal Worker - Cultivator (3-6 Months)	7	5	2
Marginal Worker - Agriculture Labourers (3-6 Months)	110	45	65
Marginal Worker - Household Industries (3-6 Months)	1	0	1
Marginal Worker - Other (3-6 Months)	3	3	0
Marginal Worker (0-3 Months)	2	1	1
Marginal Worker - Cultivator (0-3 Months)	0	0	0
Marginal Worker - Agriculture Labourers (0-3 Months)	2	1	1
Marginal Worker - Household Industries (0-3 Months)	0	0	0
Marginal Worker - Other Workers (0-3 Months)	0	0	0
Non Worker	445	141	304
