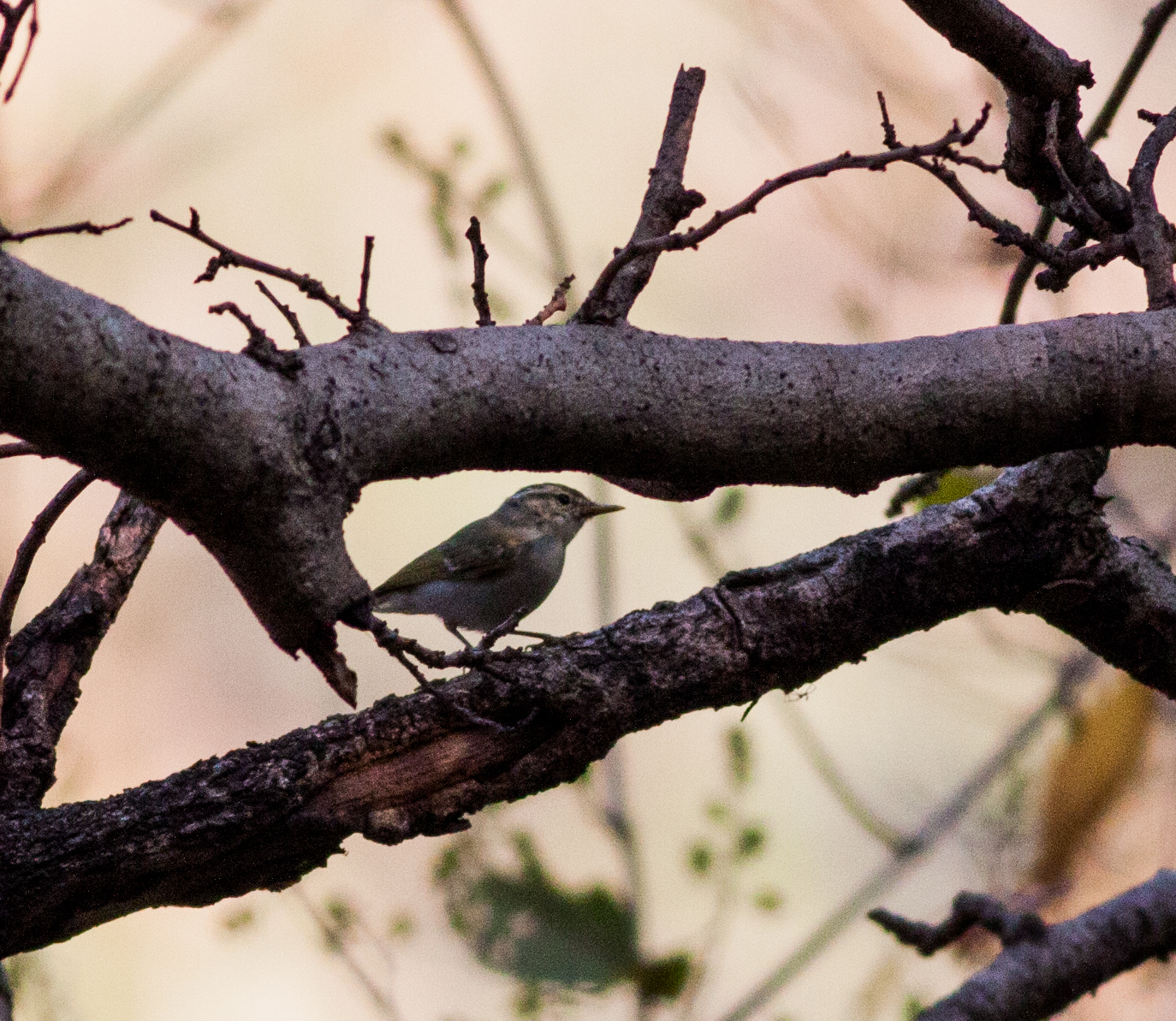
- at Kullu - Manali District of Himachal Pradesh, India.

Conservation status
- Least Concern (IUCN 3.1)

Scientific classification
- Kingdom: Animalia
- Phylum: Chordata
- Class: Aves
- Order: Passeriformes
- Family: Phylloscopidae
- Genus: Phylloscopus
- Species: P. occipitalis

Binomial name
- Phylloscopus occipitalis (Blyth, 1845)

= Western crowned warbler =

Species of bird

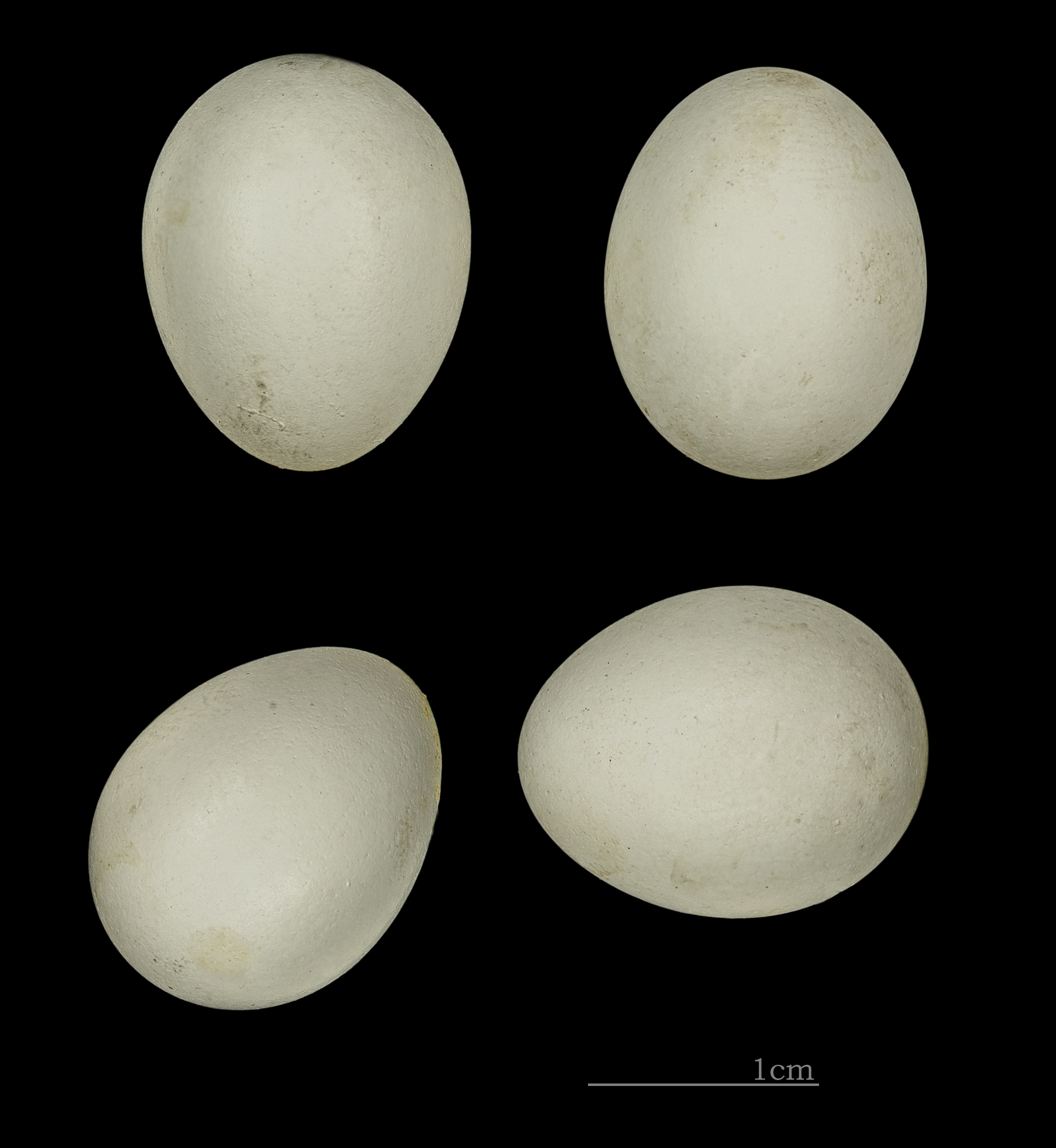
Eggs of Phylloscopus occipitalis MHNT

The western crowned warbler (Phylloscopus occipitalis) is a leaf warbler which breeds in Central Asia. It winters in the forests of the Western Ghats. It prefers forests with high foliage complexity and tree density.

The nest is built in a hole, and the typical clutch is four eggs.

The species has a distinctive crown stripe and two wing-bars. It often moves in small flocks or in mixed hunting parties.

== Description ==
It can be identified by its large pale beak, grayish mantle, crown stripes, and pale legs.

== Diet ==
The western crowned warbler is an insectivore.
