= Muthathi =

- Village
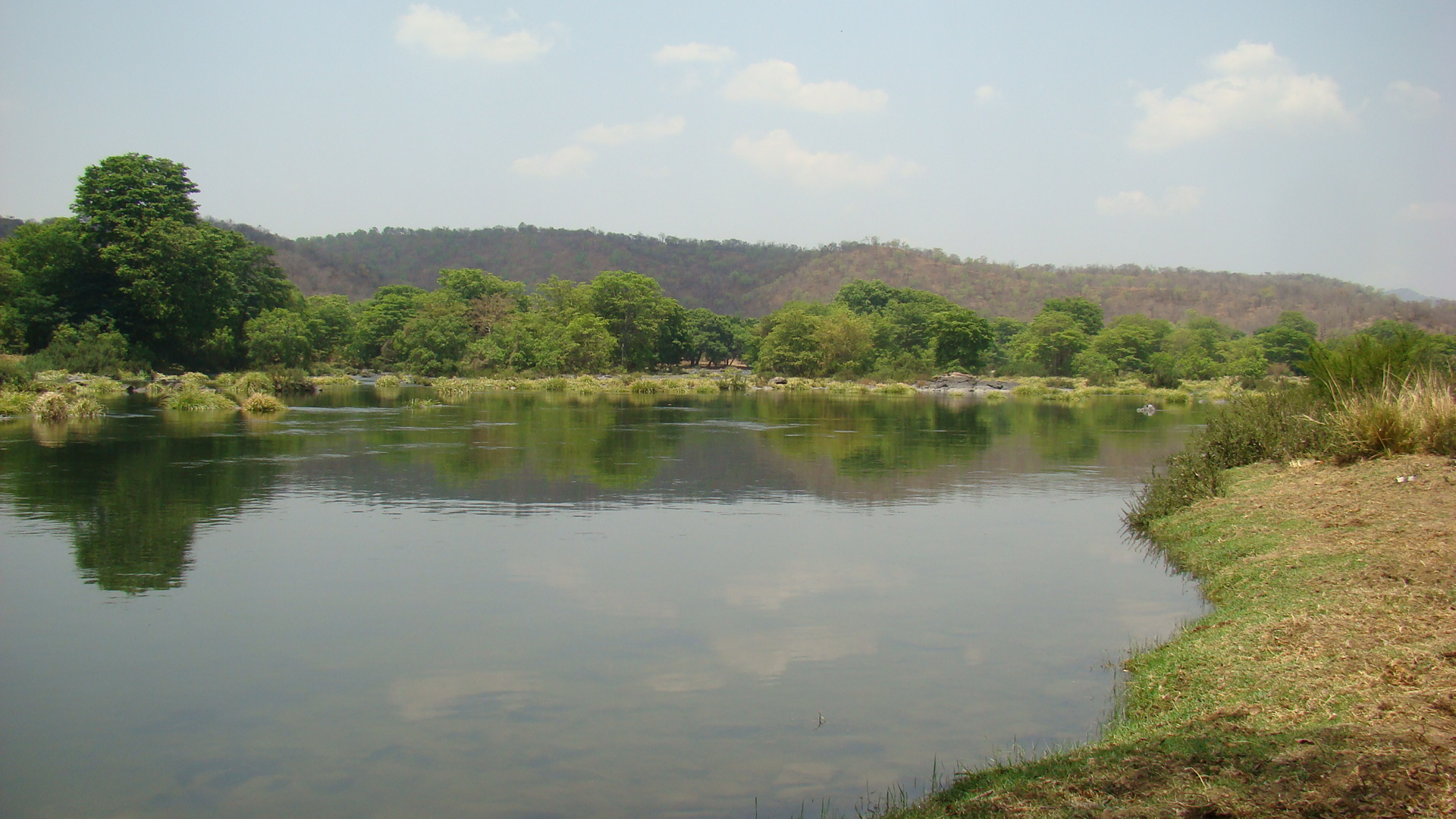

- Location in Karnataka, India
- Coordinates: 12.3058998°N 77.3098752°E
- Country: India
- State: Karnataka
- District: Mandya

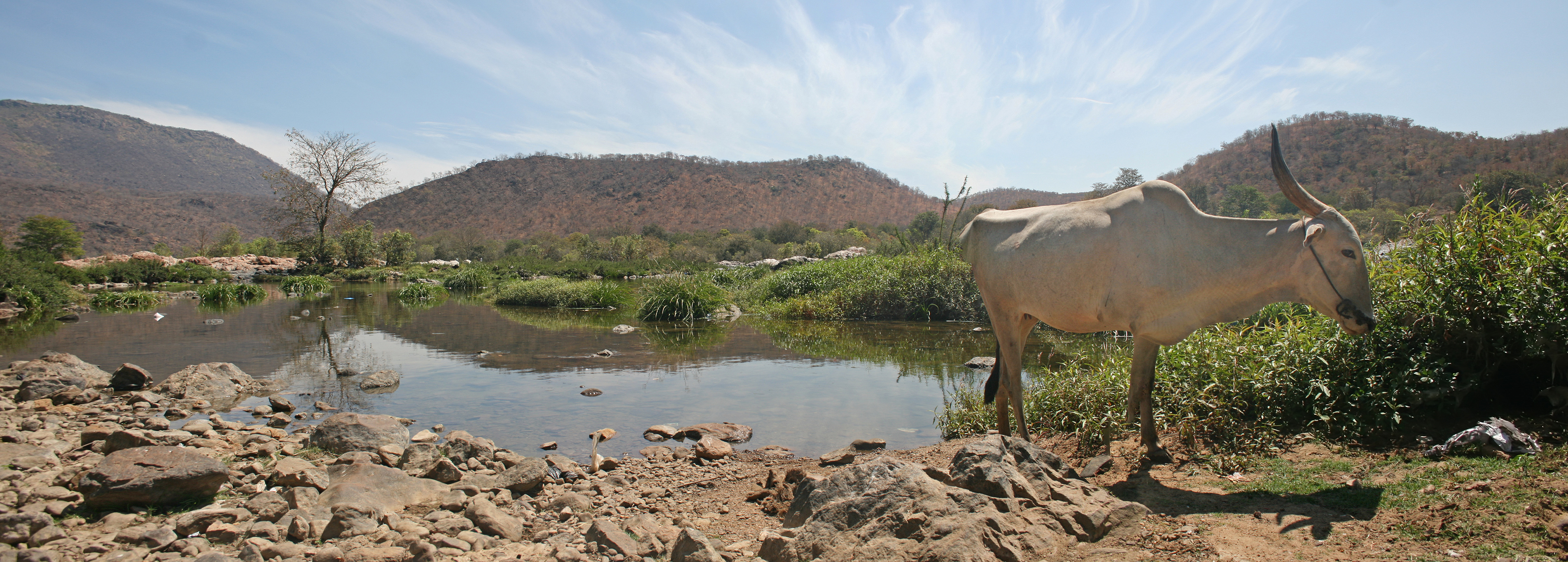
Kaveri river at Muthathi

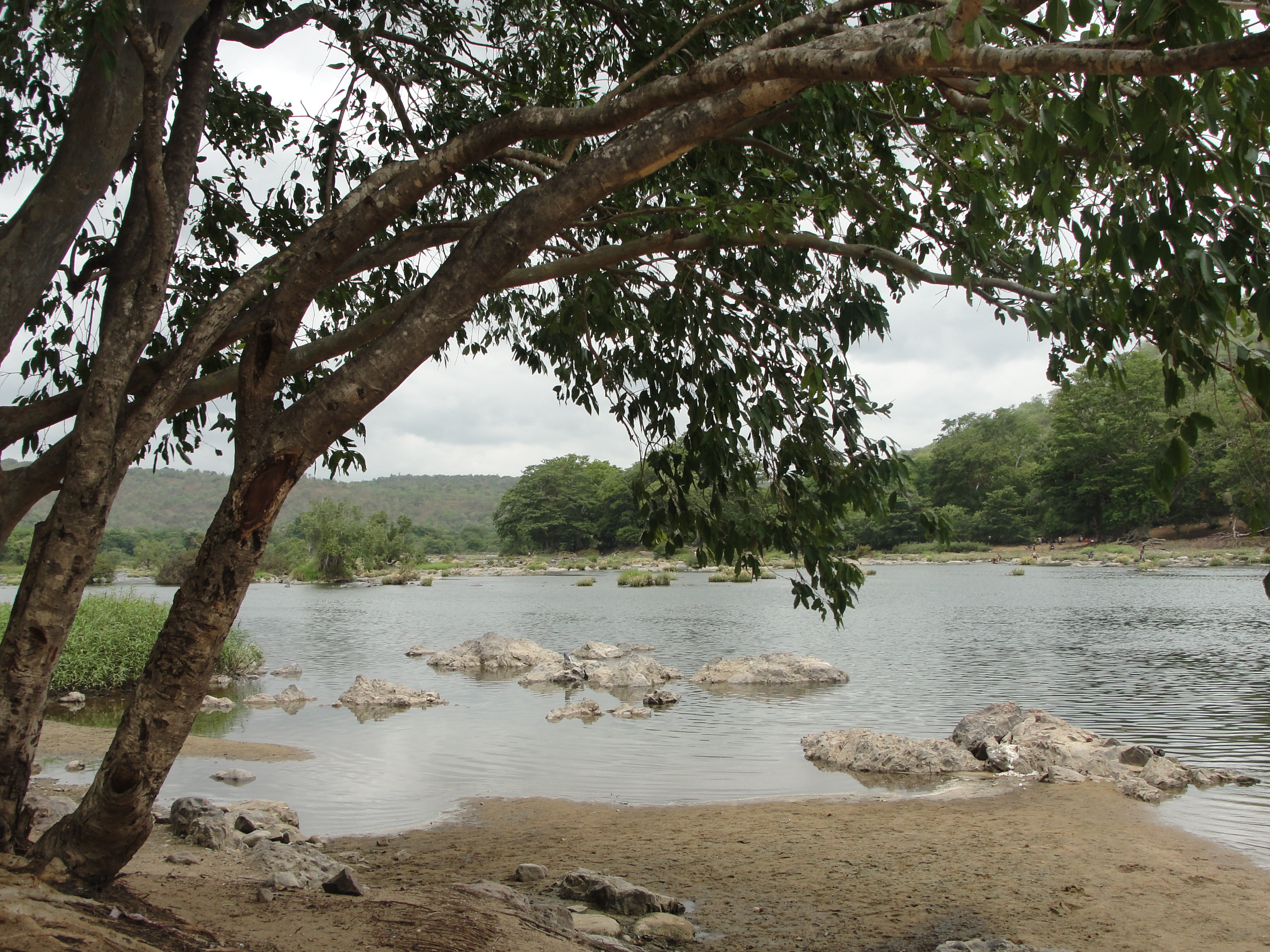
Kaveri river and sand dunes at Muthathi, Karnataka, India

Muthathi (or Muttatti) is a settlement situated on the banks of the Kaveri river near Malavalli in the Indian state of Karnataka. It is surrounded by a dense forest which is the home of the Kaveri Wildlife Sanctuary. The location has mythological associations with Sita (the wife of Rama) and Anjaneya (a Hindu deity/god), and there is a small temple dedicated to Anjaneya near the town. This well connected hilly place is accessible from Bangalore through direct bus/private vehicles. Kannada matinee idol Dr. Rajkumar was named Muthuraja after the temple deity of this place - Muthathiraya (Hanuman).

== Gallery ==
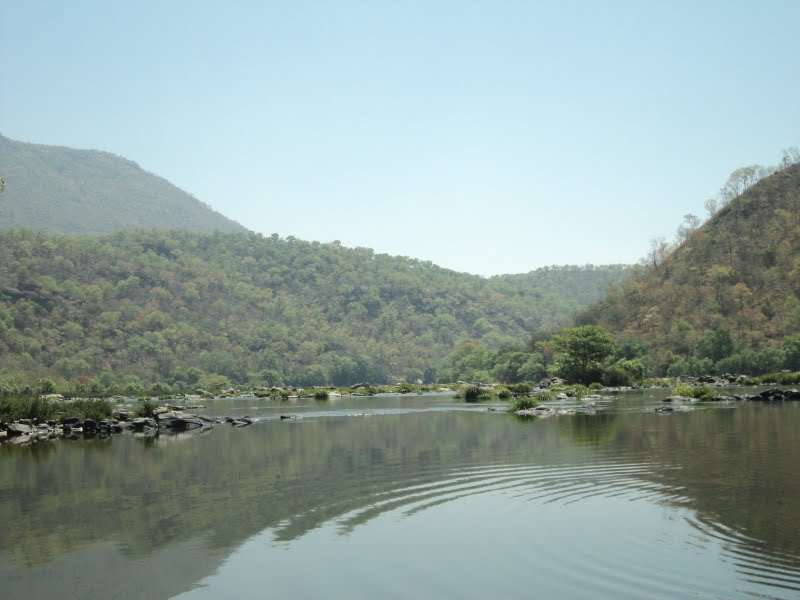

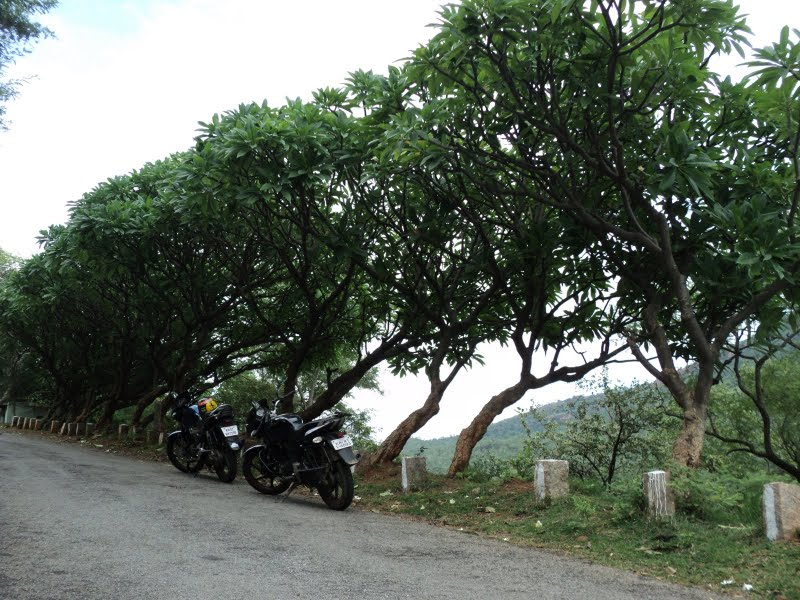

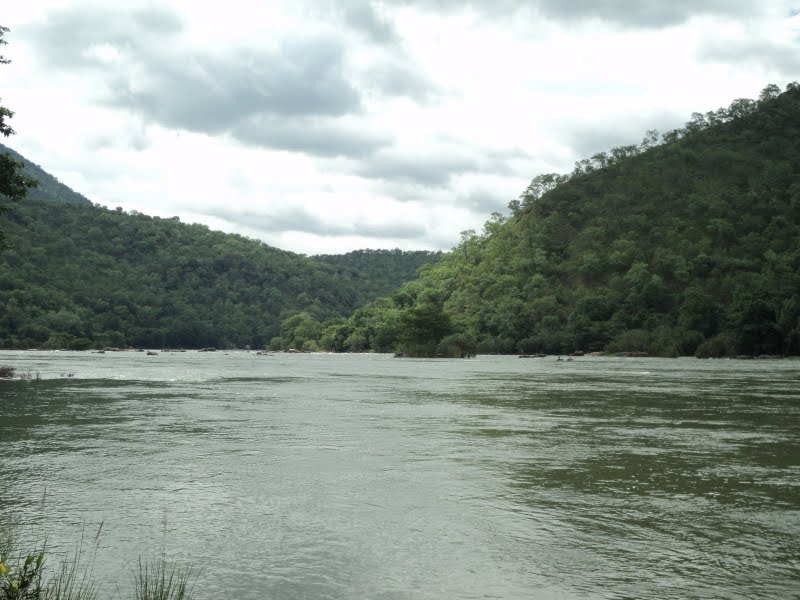

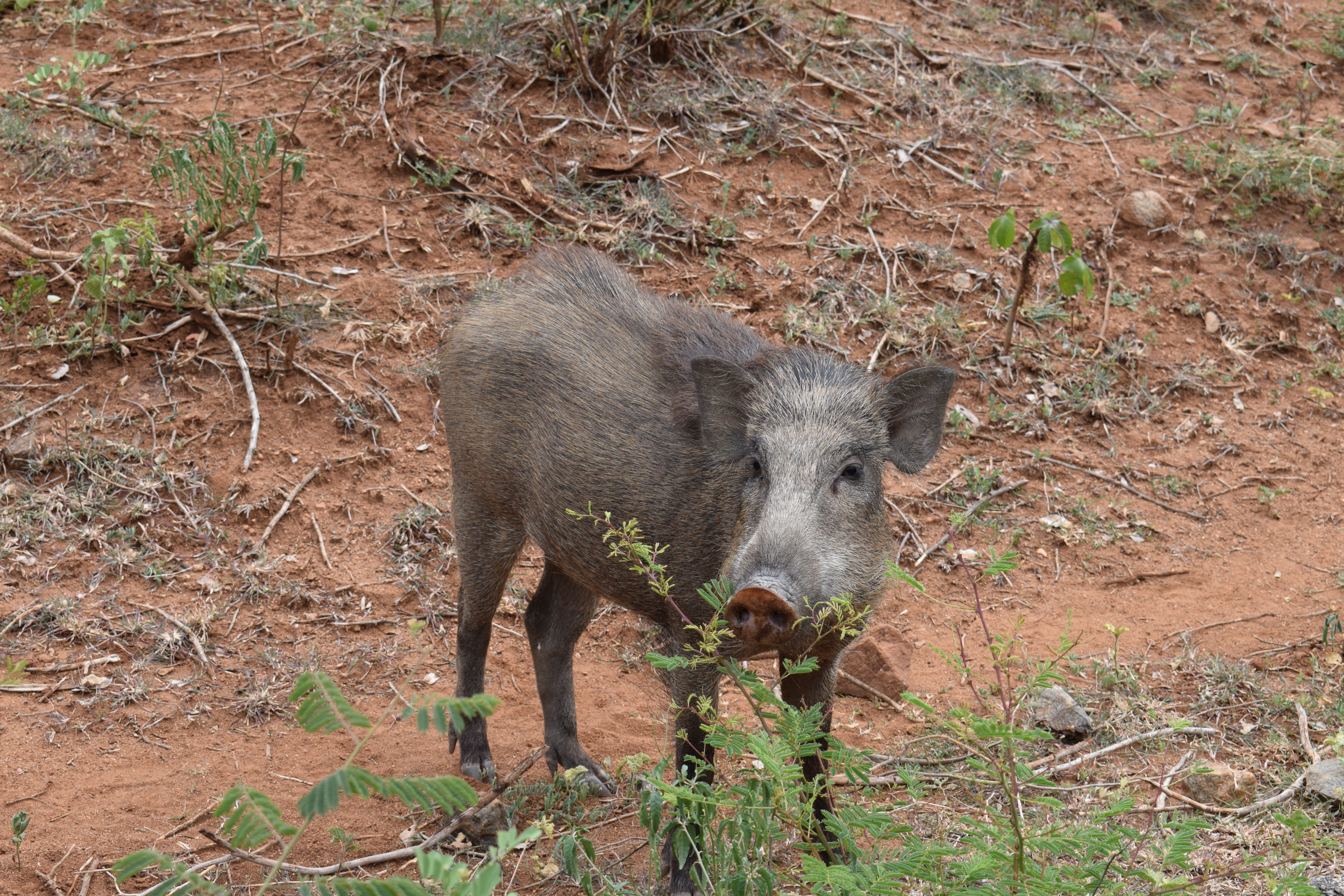
