= Mekedatu =

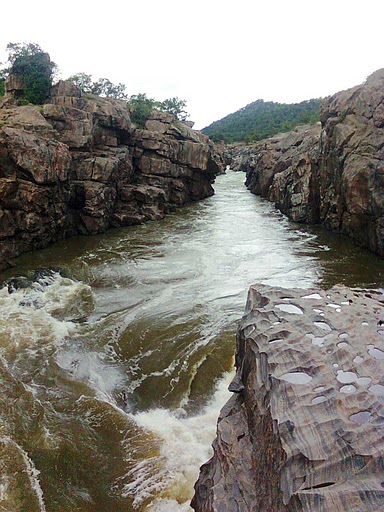
- Mekedatu,

- Location within Karnataka
- Location: Mekedatu, Ramanagara District Karnataka, India
- Coordinates: 12°15′29″N 77°26′55″E
- Watercourse: Cauvery River

Mekedatu is a location in kanakapura along Kaveri in the border of Bengaluru South and Chamarajanagar Districts. From this point, about 3.5 kilometers downstream, the river Kaveri flows through a deep and narrow gorge. Mekedatu means 'goat's leap' in Kannada. The name comes from an event which is believed to have been witnessed by herdsmen in that area a long time ago. It is said that a goat being chased by a tiger made a desperate attempt to save its life by leaping from one side of the gorge and managed to cross over the raging river below, whereas the tiger did not attempt to replicate this feat, and abandoned the chase. The point where the goat leapt has widened since then from erosion caused by the river Cauvery. It is about 110 km from Bengaluru via Kanakapura. There is also some mythological significance to this place (both Sangama and Mekedatu). In one version, the goat (meke) that is believed to have leapt across the Kaveri was Shiva in disguise. On both rocky precipices of the gorge, one can find strange holes, whose shapes resemble goats' hooves, though several times larger. It is believed that only divine goats could have marked their 'footprints' in such hard rocks.

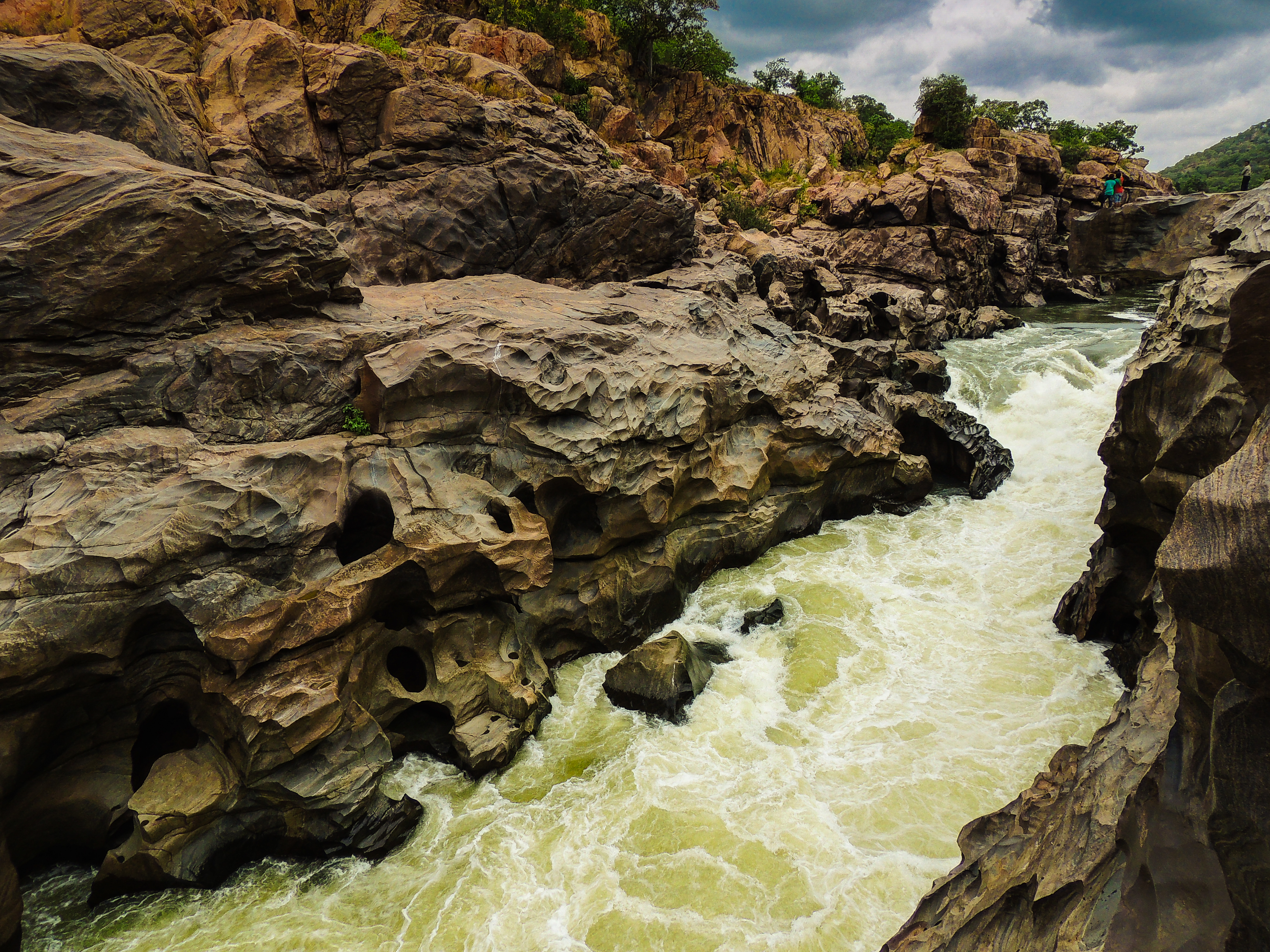
River Cauvery gushing through the deep and narrow gorge in Mekadatu, Karnataka.

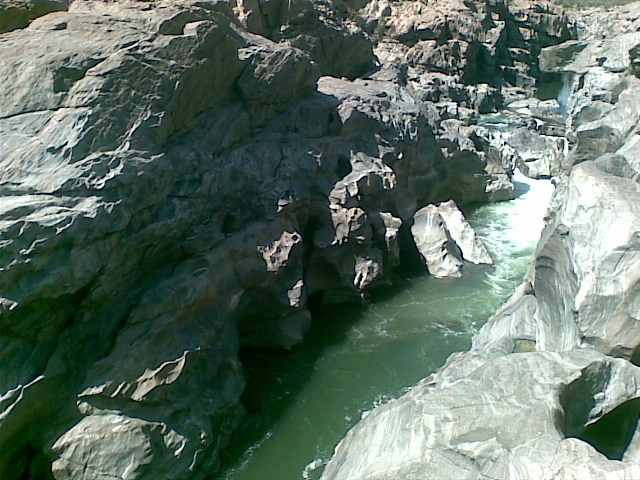
Narrow Flow Path of Cauvery at Mekedaatu

At Mekedaatu, the Kaveri runs through a deep, narrow ravine of hard granite rock. The river, which is more than 150 meters wide at the confluence (at Sangama) flows through the hardly 10-meter-wide gorge at Mekedatu. It is said that a goat could leap over it, giving the falls the name Goat's Leap. Upstream on the Kaveri is the well known Shivanasamudra Falls with its hydro-electric power station, which was set up in 1902.

== Gorge ==
The water flows very fast through the gorge, gouging pits in the rocky riverbed. The rocks are slippery making it difficult to climb down the gorge. It is dangerous to swim in the river due to the hard and slippery rocks. Despite warning signs indicating that it is dangerous to swim in the gorge many people attempt it. There have been numerous incidents of people drowning at this place.

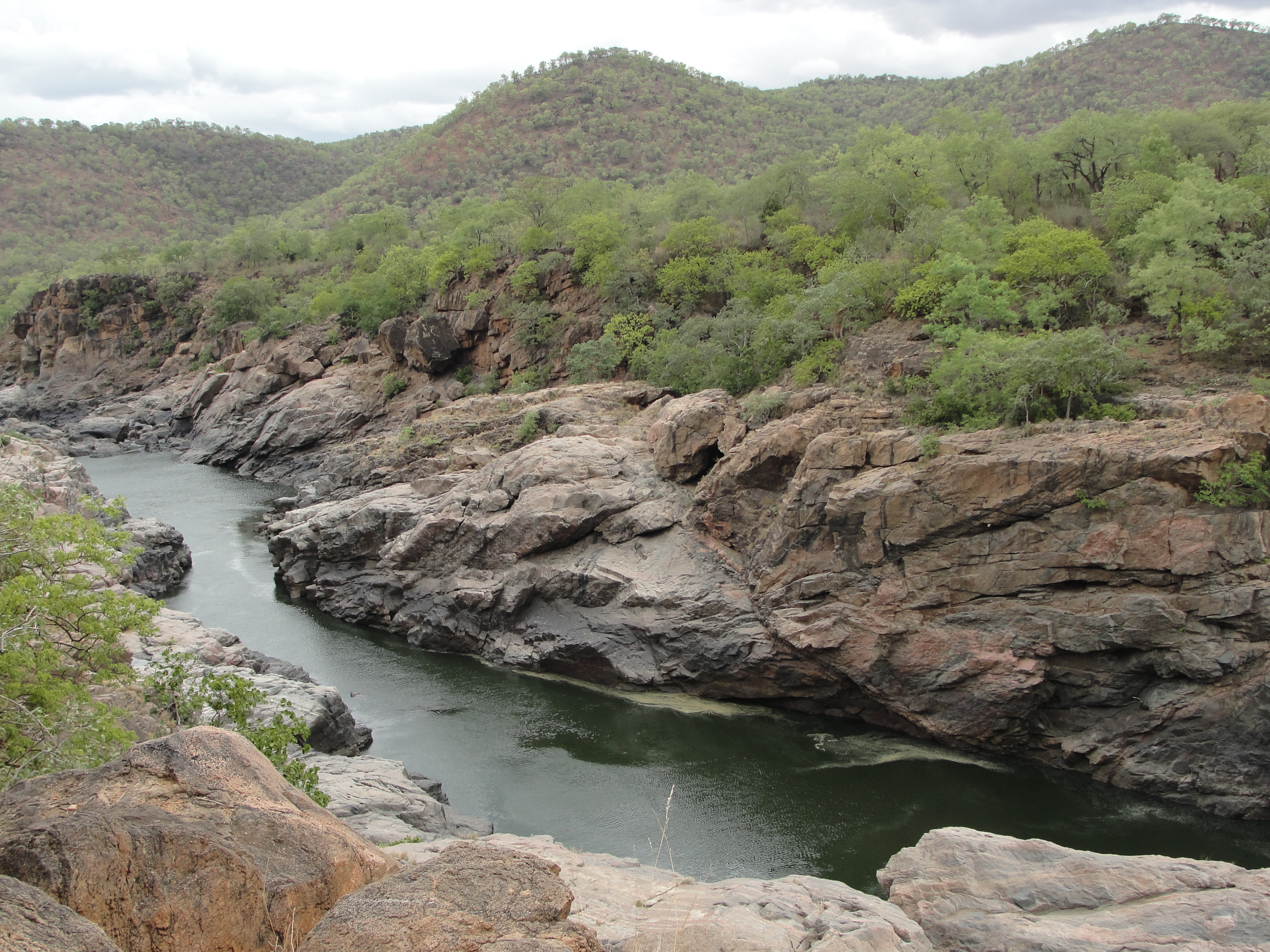
Cauvery river dries up in summer, making look of gorge more dangerous

== Directions ==
Kaveri river flowing at Mekedatu

From Bangalore there are many tour operators who provide transport to Sangama.

From Kanakapura it is exactly 26 km. The drive to mekedatu takes one through the rustic interior villages of Karnataka making the drive a memorable one. On the way there are boards showing directions to Mekedaatu and Sangama. One will have to first drive to Sangama and then proceed to Mekedatu from there.

On the way to Mekedaatu there is fishing camp called Galibore Fishing Camp.

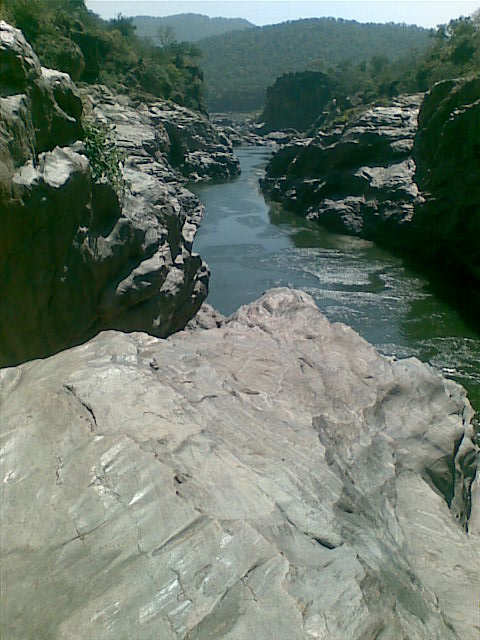
Cauvery at Mekedaatu

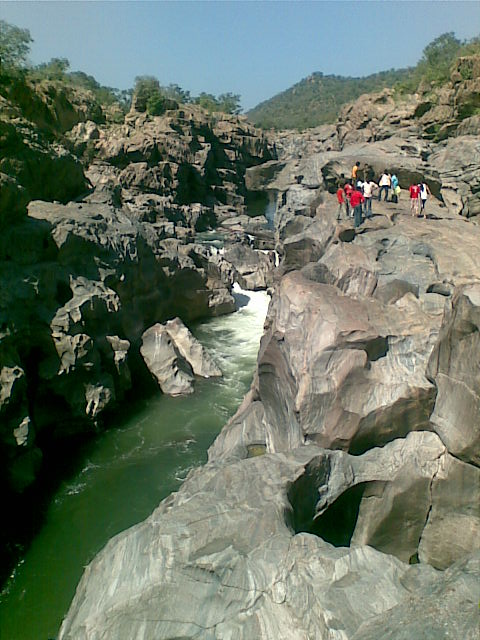
Visitors at Mekedaatu

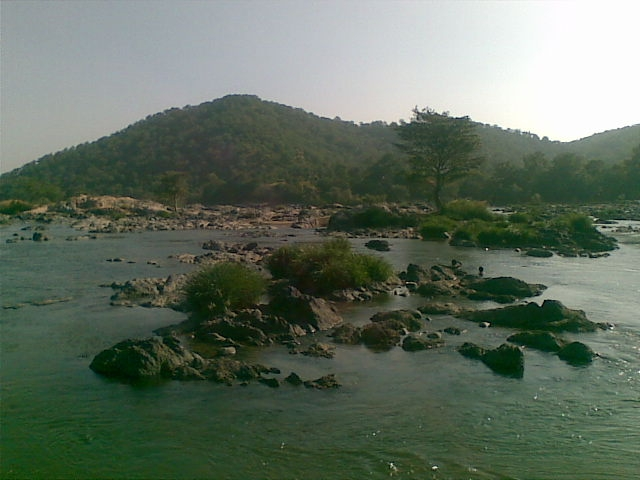
Cauvery at Sangama

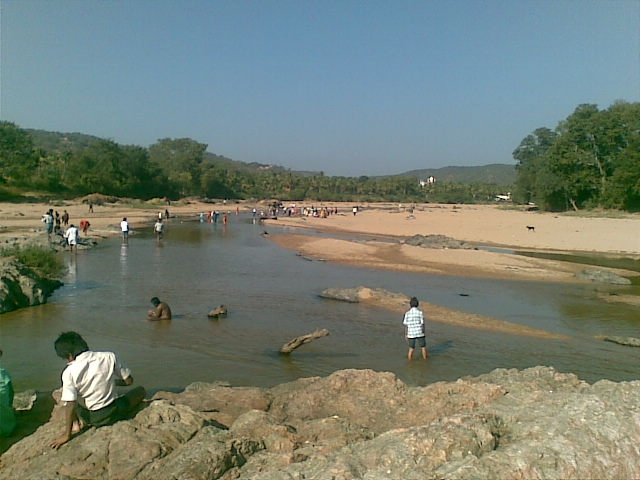
Arkavathi-Cauvery Sangama

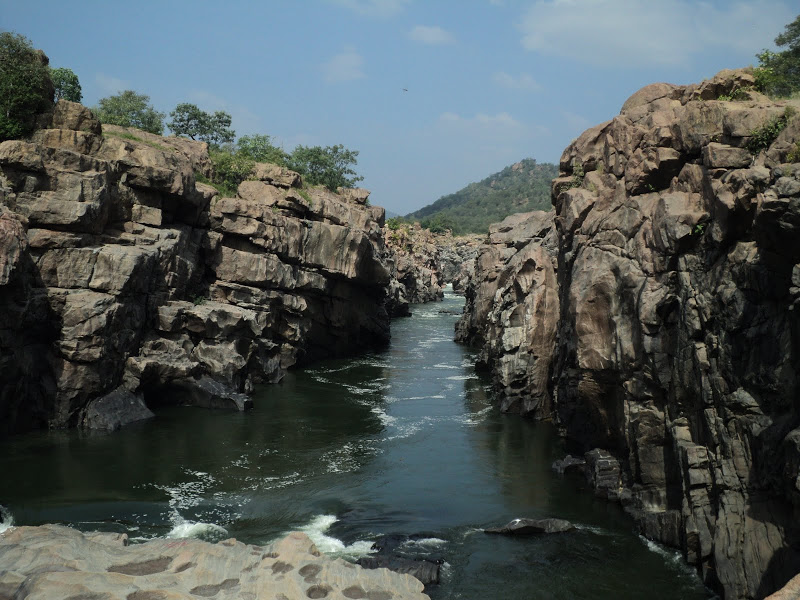
Mekedatu-Loaps

== Nearby ==
This place is en route to Mekedatu. Only a few people visit this place as most of them go by bus. In case people go on foot from Sangama, this place wouldn't be that hard to spot. Here water is not that powerful when compared to the actual place, thus making it much safer.

Chunchi Falls which is on Arkavati river is another nearby attraction in Kanakapura.

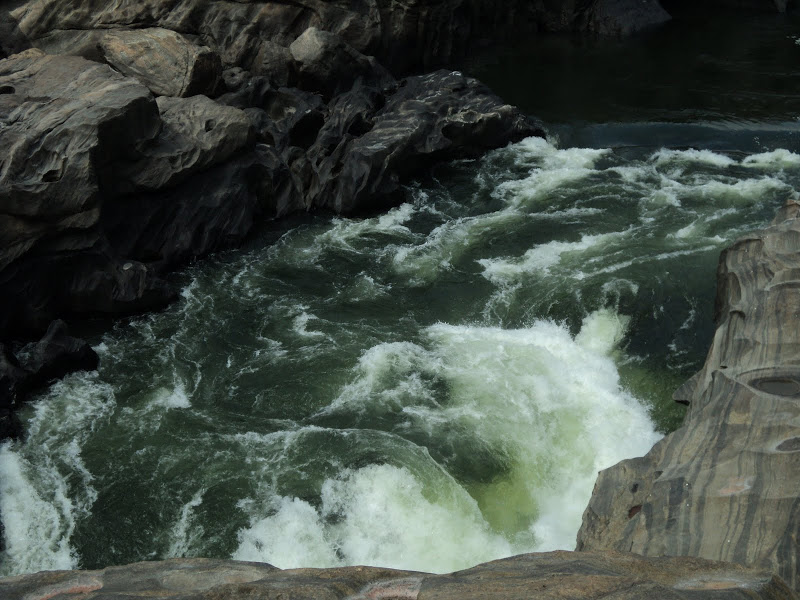
Current at Mekedatu
