= Malavalli =

- Town
- Location in Karnataka, India Malavalli (India)
- Coordinates: 12.38°N 77.08°E
- Country: India
- State: Karnataka
- District: Mandya

Government
  - Type: Town Municipal Council
  - Body: Malavalli Town Municipal Council

Area
  - Town: 10.36 km^{2} (4.00 sq mi)
  - Rural: 806.45 km^{2} (311.37 sq mi)
- Elevation: 610 m (2,000 ft)

Population (2011)
  - Town: 37,601
  - Density: 3,629/km^{2} (9,400/sq mi)
  - Rural: 245,664

Languages
  - Official: Kannada
- Time zone: UTC+5:30 (IST)
- PIN: 571430
- Vehicle registration: KA-11
- Website: www.malavallitown.mrc.gov.in

Malavalli is a town and a taluka in Mandya district in the Indian state of Karnataka. Malavalli town in history is quoted dates back to 27 March 1799 - Fourth Anglo Mysore War. Battle of Malavalli was fought between Tippu Sultan's Mysore Army against the British East India Company led by Arthur Wellesley. The men from the town fought fiercely and laid down their lives.

The town was ruled by the Nada Yajamaan family. The postal code of Malavalli is 571430.

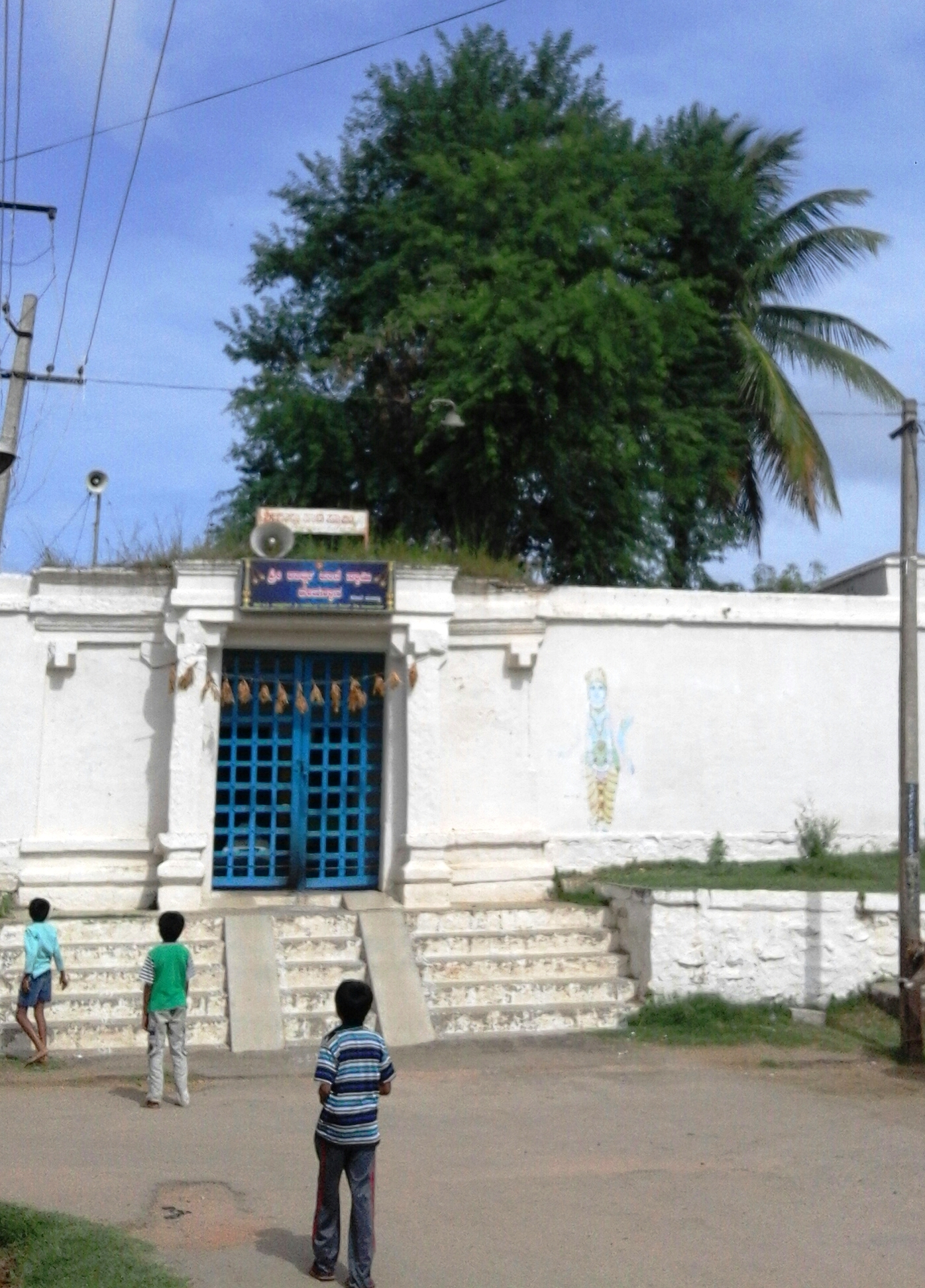
Sarangapani Temple

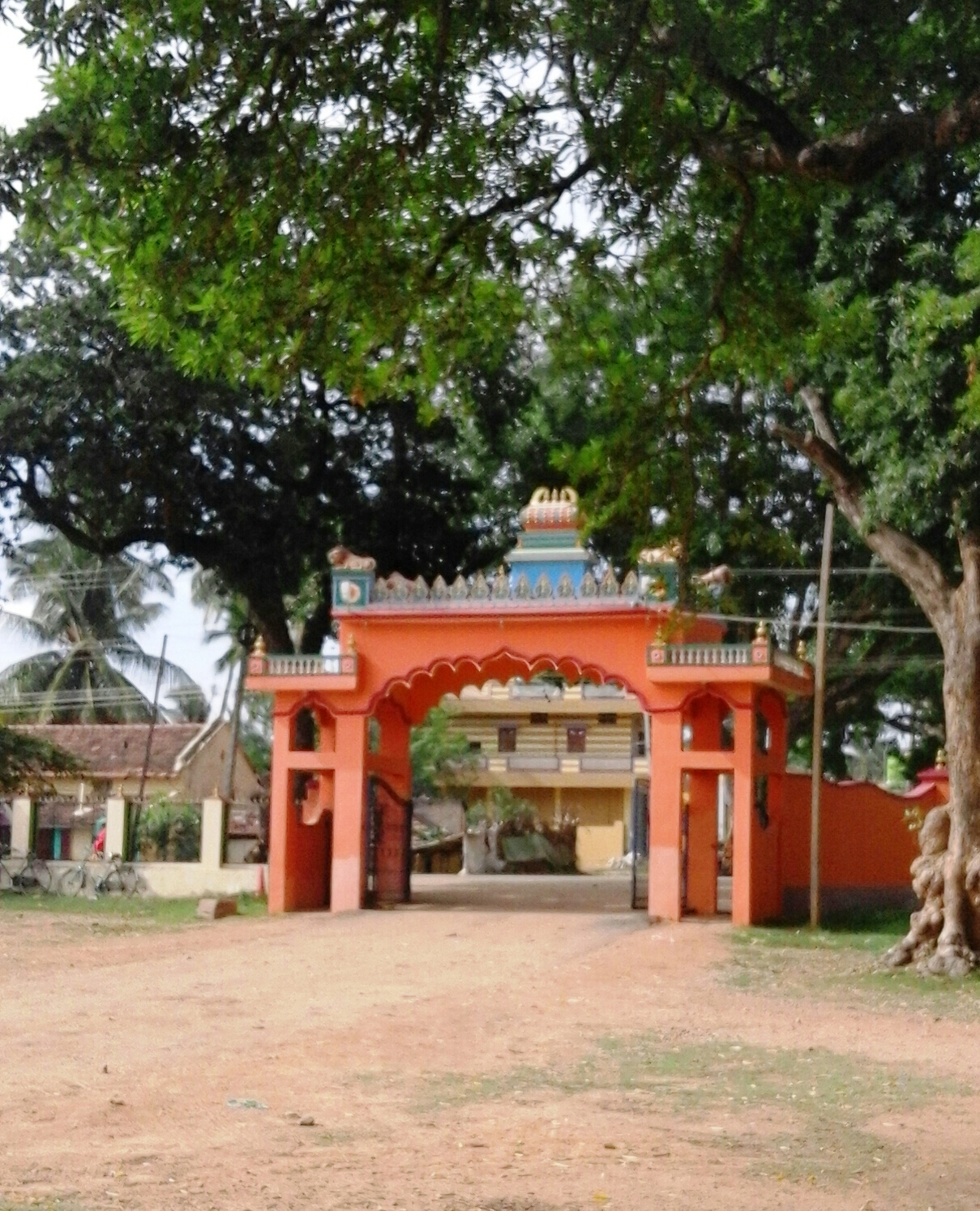
Pattiamma Temple

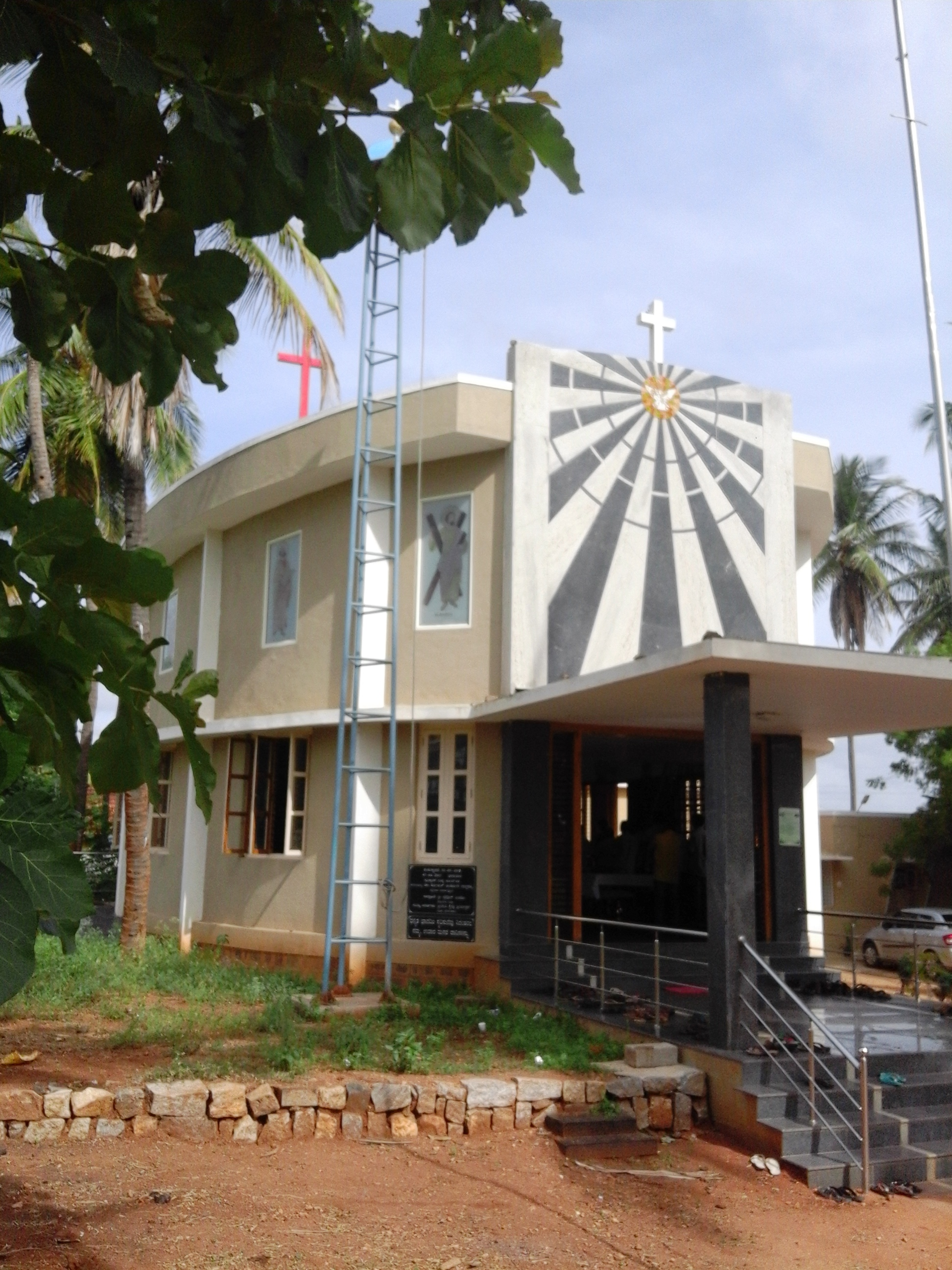
St.Mathia's Church

== Geography ==
Malavalli town is located at 12.38°N 77.08°E. It has an average elevation of 610 metres (2,000 ft).Malavalli taluk has 4 hoblis namely, Kasaba, BG Pura, Kirugavilu and Halaguru. The taluk shares its boundaries with the taluks of Maddur, Mandya, T. Narsipura, Kollegala, Channapatna, and Kanakapura Taluks

== Attractions ==
Malavalli town is a very vibrant and active rural market. It stretches for a whole length of 4 km.

Marehalli Sri Lakshmi Narasim Taluksha Sw taluks.amy Temple, Marehalli, Malavalli 2 km from Malavallli town the Marehalli Lakshmi Narasimhaswamy Temple is among the prominent Narasimhaswamy temples in Mandya District, belonging to the Sri Vaishnava tradition. Built during the 10th century and renovated by Raja Raja chola 1st the temple exists amidst thick greenery in an area of around 12 acres. It is believed that long ago two sages by name Suyagna and Lambakarna performed yagnas and tapasyas where the temple exists now. The lord Narasimhaswamy pleased with their devotion appeared in their dream and assured that he would reside there. The place was earlier known was Gajaranya Kshetra. The deity Narasimhaswamy swamy locally known as Marehalli Mudukappa is also known as sowmya Narasimhaswamy.

The temple complex consists of the “Amrutheshwara” temple at the entrance two mantapas on either side of the temple. Facing the main structure is the 40 feet long Garuda Gamba and Brundawana. An Anjuneyaswamy Temple at the left followed by Pathalankana and Ganesh temple are at the main entrance of the temple. The Bhoodevi and Neeladevi deities are also worshipped here. Surrounded by 108 pillars and ankanas. The Navaranga leads to the sanctum sanctorum. Of the temple called the Shukanasini Mantapa. Where the lord is seated with Goddess Lakshmi on his left lap. Prominent among the belief is that an “Amruthakalasha” lies beneath the lotus feet of Goddess Lakshmi, which when invoked with devotion fulfills all desires.

Athmalingeshwara Kshethra near Bharathinagar (around 13 km from Malavalli) is of equal importance.

The world famous Somanathapura Hoysala temple is located 28 km south-westerly to Malavalli

Other temples in the region are:

- Shri Anjaneya (Muthathiraya) Temple, Muthathi which is on the banks of river Kaveri.
- Sri Thayi Kabbalamma temple near Halaguru town,
- Sri Adinadu Chikkamma Thayi Temple in Chottanahalli Village,
- Sri Malai Mahadeswara temple Channipura (D. C. Pura) near by Hadli Circle
- Sri Basavewara temple and Mane Manchamma Thayi temple Agasanapura
- Nadumargada Basaveswara temple in Halaguru Malavalli main road
- Sri Dharege Doddavaru Manteswamy temple Matada Honna Nayakanahalli near Halaguru town
- Antarahalli Siddapaji temple in K. M. Doddi and Halaguru main road
- Avverahalli Saneswara temple near Malavalli town(6 km)
- Hebbetada Basaveswara nearby Halaguru town
- Udbhava Murthy Sri Chenna Someshwara temple in Belathur village, around 8 km from Halaguru town
- Kamadenu, Basaveswara and Shaneswara Temple in Thuraganuru village near Hadly Circle Malavalii
- Sri Abhaya Anjaneya temple and Kalabairaveswara temple in Aladahalli village near Hadly Circle
- Sri Matthithaleshwara Temple, Kalluveeranahalli, Malavalli Taluk (9 km north of town)
- Sri Kaleshwara Temple, Yathambadi, Malavalli Taluk (24 km north-east of town)
- Sri Matthitaleswara temple, Kalluveranahalli
- Ganalu falls(benki falls)

Nearby are the Shivanasamudra waterfalls, Shimsha, Cauvery Wildlife Sanctuary, Muthathi forest, Bheemeshwari Cauveri fishing camp near Halaguru., Galibore fishing camp and more

== Demographics ==
As of 2001 India census, Malavalli had a population of 35,800. Males constitute 51% of the population and females 49%. Malavalli has an average literacy rate of 64%, higher than the national average of 59.5%: male literacy is 69%, and female literacy is 58%. In Malavalli, 13% of the population is under 6 years of age. It has 186 villages as per 2001 census.

In higher/professional education segment at Malavalli, there are absolutely no Medical/Engineering/Nursing/Pharmacy colleges/ Polytechnics at Malavalli Town, except a para medical college i.e., Vidya Institute of Para Medical Sciences which is at Mysore road, Malavalli.

Apart from this, among degree and pre-university colleges, Shanthi College and Government College are at Malavalli in addition to few others.

== See also ==
- Halaguru
- Maddur, Mandya
- Alada Halli
