= Shivanasamudra Falls =

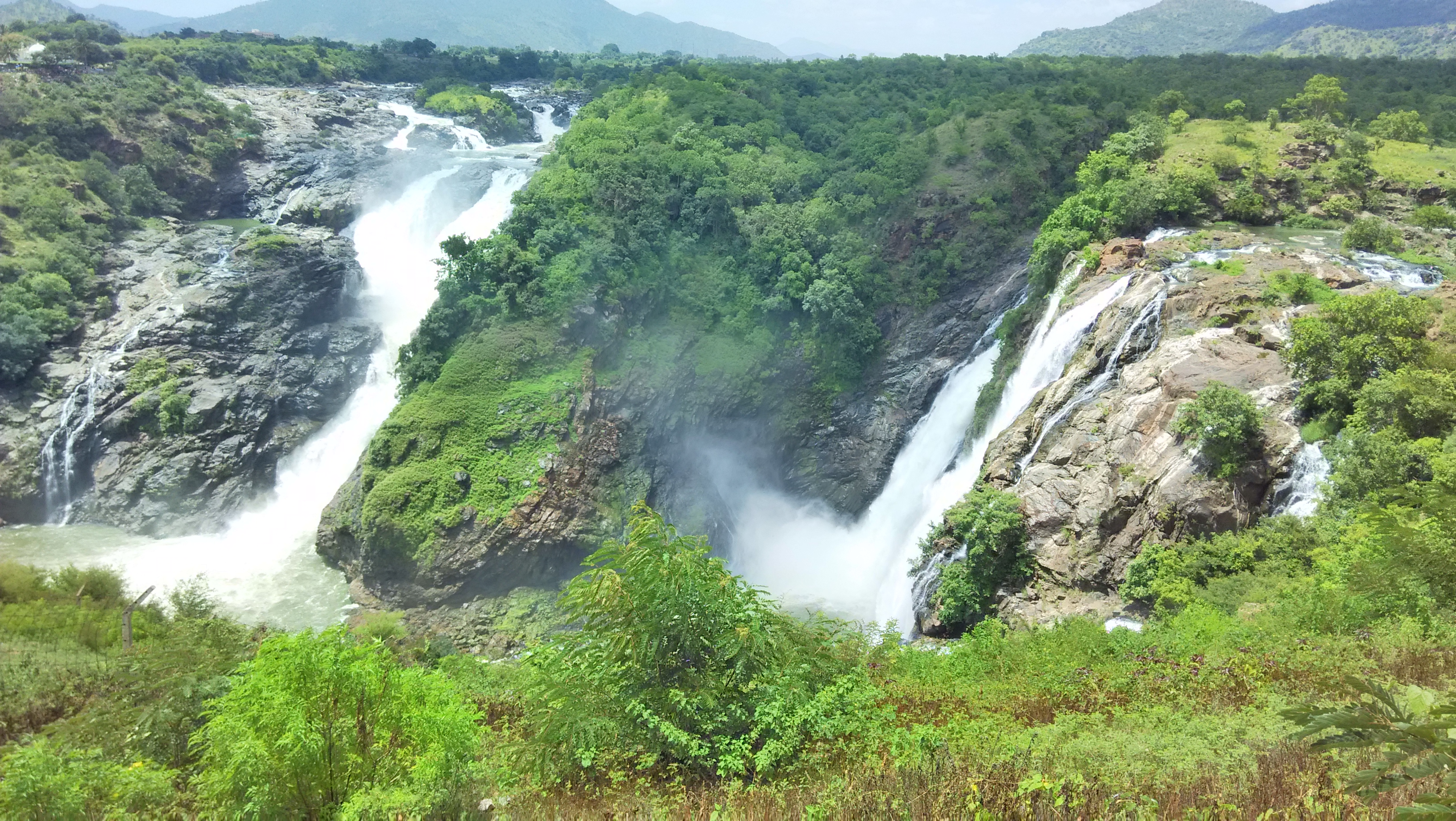
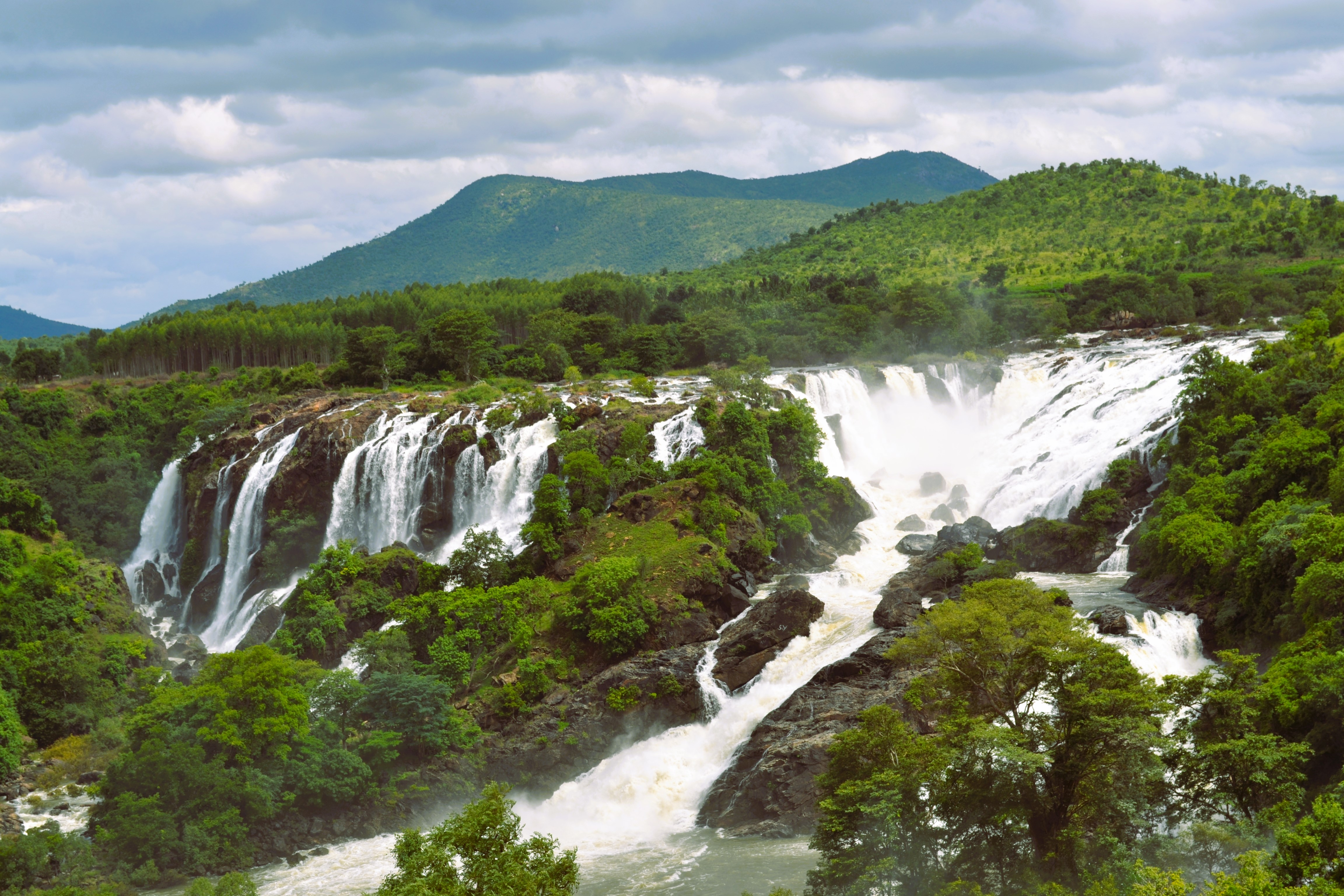
- Gagana Chukki Bhara Chukki

- Location within Karnataka
- Location: Malavalli taluk, Mandya district, Karnataka, India
- Coordinates: 12°17′30″N 77°10′30″E
- Type: Segmented
- Total height: 91 m (299 ft)
- Watercourse: Kaveri

Shivanasamudra Falls is a series of segmented waterfalls on the Kaveri river. It is situated in Malavalli taluk in Mandya district, Karnataka. It consists of two series of drops, named Gagana Chukki and Bhara Chukki. The waterfalls has a vertical drop of 91 m (299 ft) and swells to 300 m (980 ft) in width during the monsoon season.

The waterfalls is used to generate hydro-electric power, and the associated power station was established in 1902.

== Waterfalls ==
Shivanasamudra Falls is a segmented waterfall located on the Kaveri River in Mandya district of Karnataka. The Kaveri river arises at Talakaveri in the Western Ghats and flows eastwards through a narrow gorge onto the Deccan Plateau. The river flows south-east from Srirangapatna towards Shivanasamudra, where it splits into two branche before forming the Shivanasamudra Falls. The river converges around the island of Shivanasamudra, and passes through the Mekedatu gorge before flowing towards the state of Tamil Nadu.

Shivasamudra translates to "sea of Shiva". The falls consists of a series of rapids with a vertical drop of 91 m (299 ft). It is formed of two series of waterfalls, Gagana Chukki, which plunges the full height of the waterfalls, and Bhara Chukki, which has a drop of 69 m (226 ft). The waterfalls reach a width of up to 300 m (980 ft) during the monsoon season.

== Power generation ==
The waterfalls is used to generate hydroelectric power. The idea of tapping power from the falls to supply power for the machinery at the Kolar Gold Fields was suggested in 1898 by Alain Chartier Joly de Lotbiniere. The project was designed by K. Seshadri Iyer and M. Visvesvaraya, and opened in 1902. Power drawn from the facility was later used to supply power to Bengaluru and Mysuru. A solar power plant was established near the waterfalls in 2014.

== See also ==
- List of waterfalls
- List of waterfalls in India
- List of waterfalls by flow rate
