= Agraharam =

Historical Indian land grant to Brahmins

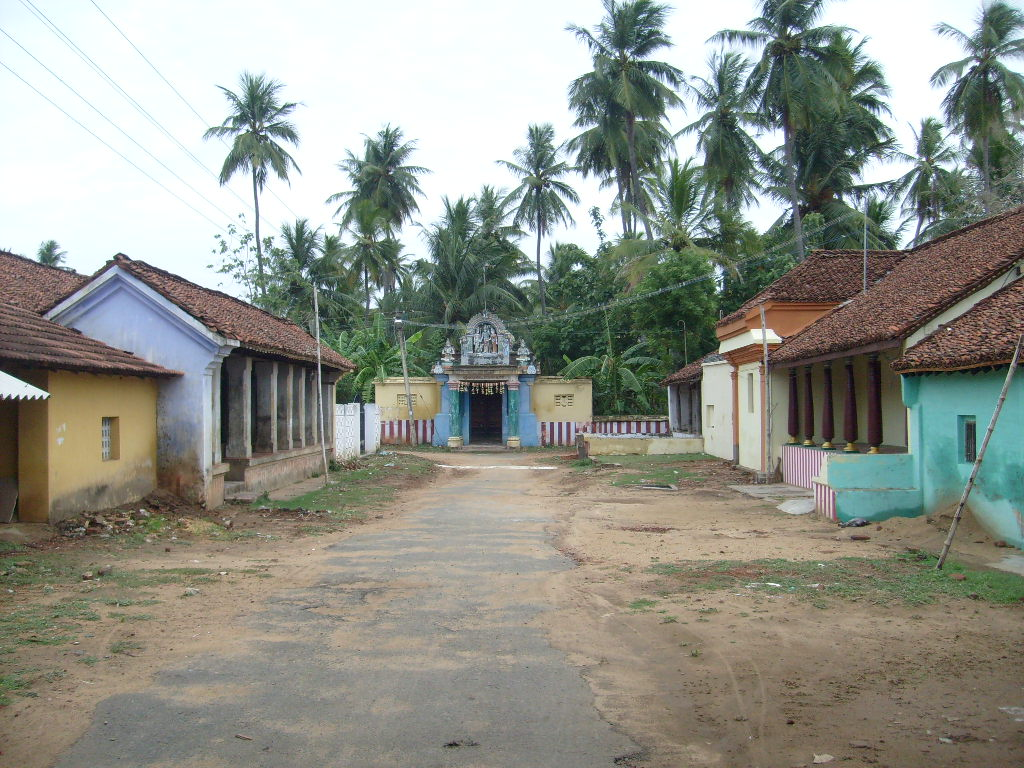
An Agraharam in Thanjavur District, Tamil Nadu

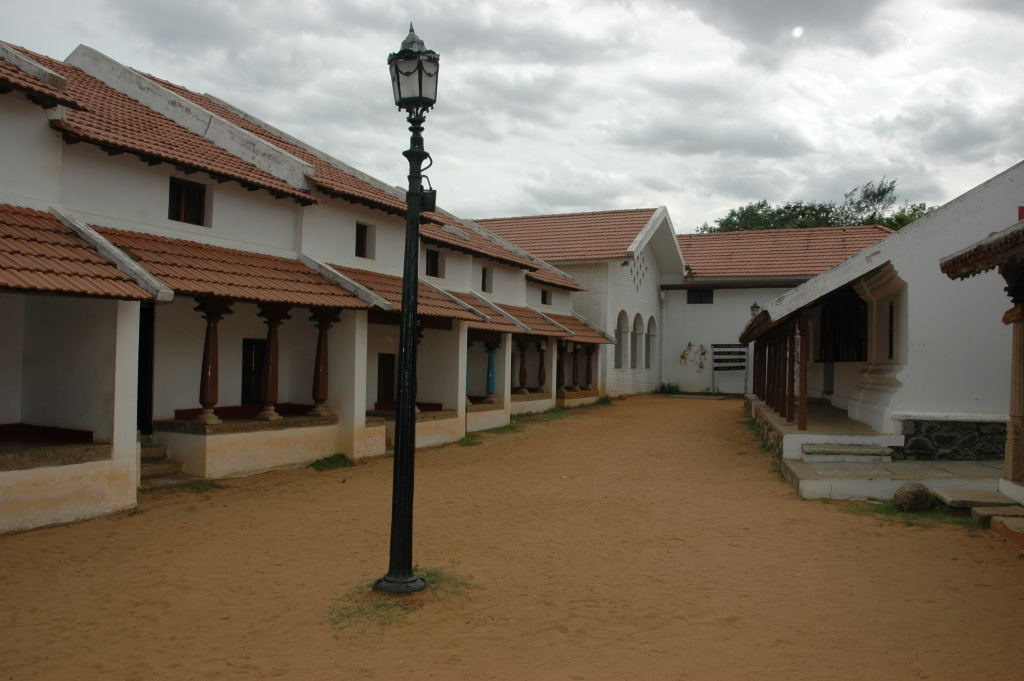
An Agraharam from Tirunelveli assembled within the DakshinaChitra museum.

An Agraharam (Sanskrit IAST: agrahāram) or Agrahara (Sanskrit IAST: agrahāra) was a grant of land and royal income from it, typically by a king or a noble family in India, for religious purposes, particularly to Brahmins to maintain temples in that land or a pilgrimage site and to sustain their families. Agraharams were also known as Chaturvedimangalams in ancient times. They were also known as ghatoka, and boya. Agraharams were built and maintained by dynasties such as the Pandya, Cholas, Kadambas, Pallavas, Vijayanagara and other Deccan dynasties since ancient times.

They were known by different names in different parts of India, like Sāsana in Odisha. The name Agraharam originates from the fact that the agraharams have lines of houses on either side of the road and the temple to the village god at the centre, thus resembling a garland around the temple. According to the traditional Hindu practice of architecture and town-planning, an agraharam is held to be two rows of houses running north–south on either side of a road at one end of which would be a temple to Shiva and at the other end, a temple to Vishnu. An example is Vadiveeswaram in Tamil Nadu.

With Brahmins taking up professions in urban areas and some migrating abroad, Agraharams are vanishing fast. Many of the traditional houses are giving way to concrete structures and commercial buildings. Agraharams were started in south India during the Pallava period since they followed Vedas. Initially the Agraharam was maintained fully using royal patronage but later the Agraharam become a self-sustaining economy.

== History ==
An early example of an existing description of an agraharam has been found in a 3rd-century CE Sangam work called Perumpāṇāṟṟuppaṭai.

The houses had in front of them, a shed with short legs to which were tied fat calves; the houses were washed with cowdung and had idols (inside them). Domestic fowl and dogs did not approach them. It was the village of the guardians of the Veda who teach its sounds to the parrots with the bent mouth. If you (bard) reach (the place), fair faced bangled ladies who are as chaste as (Arundhathi) the little star which shines in the north of the bright, broad sky, will after sunset feed you on the well-cooked rice named after the bird (explained by the commentator as the rice called irasanam) along with slices of citron boiled in butter taken, from the buttermilk derived from red cows and scented with the leaves of the karuvembu, and mixed with pepper-powder, and the sweet-smelling tender fruit plucked from the tall mango tree and pickled.

== Places with the name Agraharam or Agrahara ==
=== Andhra Pradesh ===
There are a number of places in Andhra Pradesh named agraharam. These places may have originated as Bramhin-populated villages. Examples of such settlements include:

- Agraharam, Kanuru, in Peravali mandal of the West Godavari district
- Agraharam, Siddavaram, in Porumamilla mandal of Kadapa district
- Aatreyapuram Agraharam, village and a mandal in East Godavari district
- Chennupalli Agraharam, in Ballikurva mandal of Prakasam district
- Chintapalli agraharam, in Pentapadu mandal of West Godavari district
- Kotha Agraharam, in S.Rayavaram mandal of Vishakhapatnam district
- Tirumala Samudra Agraharam (T S Agraharam) in palamaner Mandal of chittoor district

=== Karnataka ===
There are a number of places in Southern Karnataka named agrahara. These places might have, probably, originated as Brahmin villages.

- Agrahara, (near Baragur) Handikunte post, Sira taluk, Tumkur district
- Agrahara, Arkalgud, in Hassan district
- Agrahara, Arsikere, in Hassan district
- Agrahara, Channarayapatna, in Hassan district
- Agrahara, Chiknayakanhalli, in Tumkur district
- Agrahara, Chintamani, in Kolar district
- Agrahara, Holalkere, in Chitradurga district
- Agrahara, Hosadurga, in Chitradurga district
- Agrahara, Hunsur, in Mysore district
- Agrahara, Kadur, in Chikmagalur district
- Agrahara, Kanakapura, in Bangalore Rural district
- Agrahara, Koratagere, in Tumkur district
- Agrahara, Malur, in Kolar district
- Agrahara, Sandur, in Bellary district
- Agrahara, Shrirangapattana, in Mandya district
- Agrahara, Sira, in Tumkur district
- Agrahara, Srinivaspur, in Kolar district
- Agrahara Bachahalli, in Krishnarajpet taluk of Mandya district
- Agrahara Palya, in Bangalore North taluk of Bangalore district
- Agrahara Somarasanahalli, in Kola taluk of Kolar district
- Agrahara Vaddahalli, in Hosakote taluk of Bangalore Rural district
- Agrahara Valagerehalli, in Channapatna taluk of Bangalore Rural district
- Konappana Agrahara, town in Anekal taluk adjoining Electronics City
- Konena Agrahara
- Roopena Agrahara
- Kalena Agrahara

=== Tamil Nadu ===
- Annalagraharam, village in Kumbakonam taluk of Thanjavur district
- Ganapathi Agraharam, village in Thanjavur district
- Bommasamudram Agraharam, village in Vasan Nagar, Tiruchirappalli district
- Pallipalayam Agraharam, village in Namakkal district
- Devakottai Silambani Agraharam, located in Sivaganga district
- Thiruvattar Agraharam in Kanyakumari district adjascent to Adikesava Perumal Temple, Kanyakumari which is home to successors of Tuluva Brahmin priests employed by the erstwhile Travancore royal family in Trivandrum

=== Kerala ===
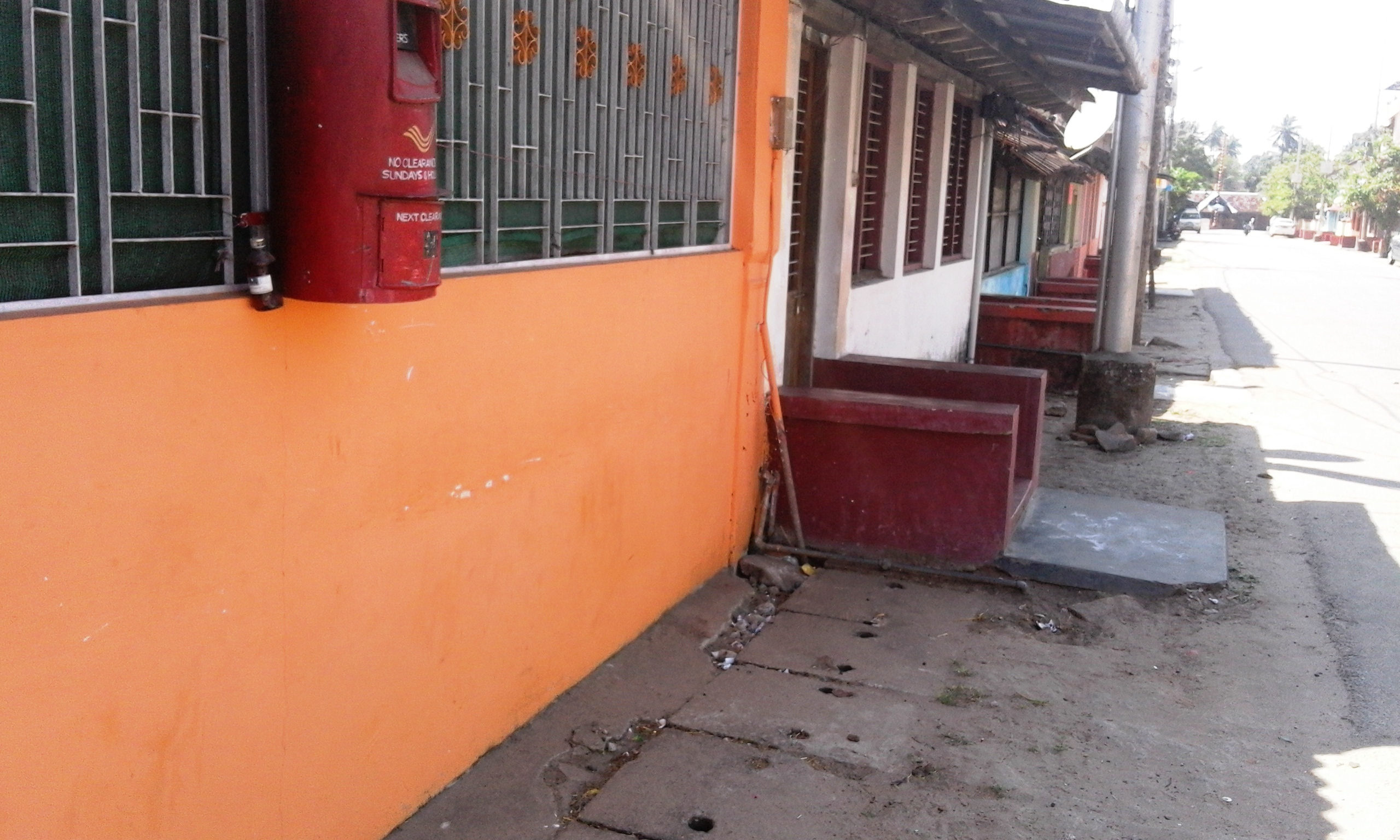
Kalpathy Agrahara, Kerala

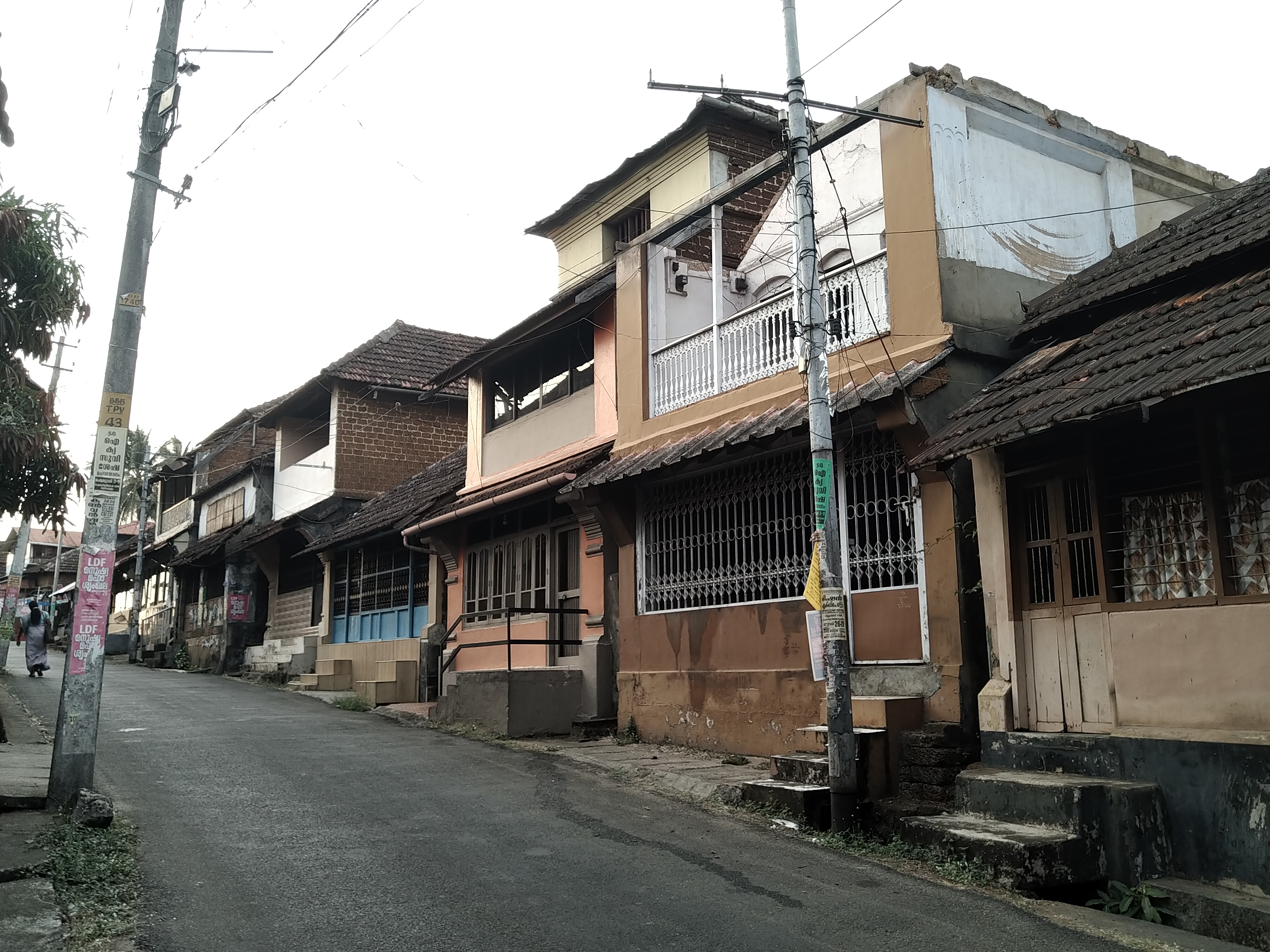
- Kunnamkulam Angady
  There is a famous Agraharam in Thiruvananthapuram, called Valiya Sala which is the lengthiest Agraharam in India.
- Agraharams in Palakkad district are around 96. When the villages are counted in the municipal area, there are around 18 of them. The concept is similar with houses in row on both sides and a temple at one end. They may differ in shapes – some are in straight line, some are T-shaped and few have multiple temples within the village.
- There are several other Agraharams in Trivandrum city including the ones in and around Padmanabhaswamy Temple, East Fort, Karamana and Ulloor.
