= Agrahara (disambiguation) =

An Agrahara was a grant of land and royal income from it.

Agrahara may also refer to:

== Karnataka, India ==
=== Bangalore Rural district ===
- Agrahara, Kanakapura

=== Bellary district ===
- Agrahara, Sandur

=== Chikmagalur district ===
- Agrahara, Kadur

=== Chitradurga district ===
- Agrahara, Holalkere
- Agrahara, Hosadurga

=== Hassan district ===
- Agrahara, Arkalgud
- Agrahara, Arsikere
- Agrahara, Channarayapatna

=== Kolar district ===
- Agrahara, Chintamani
- Agrahara, Malur
- Agrahara, Srinivaspur

=== Mandya district ===
- Agrahara, Shrirangapattana

=== Mysore district ===
- Agrahara, Hunsur
- Agrahara, Mysore, neighborhood in Mysore, India

=== Tumkur district ===
- Agrahara, Chiknayakanhalli
- Agrahara, Koratagere
- Agrahara, Sira

== See also ==
- Agrahar (disambiguation)
