= Uday Garudachar =

Indian politician

Member of Karnataka Legislative Assembly
- Incumbent
- Assumed office 2018
- Preceded by: R. V. Devraj
- Constituency: Chickpet

Personal details
- Born: 7 May 1959 (age 67) Tumakuru
- Party: Bhartiya Janta Party (since 2008)
- Spouse: Medini Uday Garudachar
- Children: 2
- Parent(s): B. N. Garudachar (Father); Vatsala (Mother)
- Occupation: Politician

Uday Garudachar (born 7 May 1959) is an Indian politician from Karnataka. He is a member of the Karnataka Legislative Assembly since 2018. He won the 2023 Karnataka Legislative Assembly election representing Bharatiya Janata Party from Chickpet Assembly constituency.

== Early life and education ==
Uday B Garudachar is the son of former IPS Officer, B. N. Garudachar and late Vatsala. His family hails from Bindiganavile Village, Nagamangala Taluk, Mandya district. His father served as the Director General of Police (DGP). He completed SSLC at St. Paul's High School, Belagavi, and Pre-university education at National PU College, Basavanagudi, Bangalore. He received a B.E. in Electronics from Bangalore University in 1987. He is also the recipient of doctoral degrees. He married Medini Uday Garudachar, who is a social activist. He is the Director of Garuda Group of Companies. He is the owner of Garuda Mall.

== Political career ==
He is also a member of the Bharatiya Janata Party. He first contested the Bihar Rajya Sabha election in early 2008 but faced defeat. In 2013, he again contested the Chickpet Assembly Constituency but lost by a small margin of votes. Finally in 2018, he won from Chickpet Assembly constituency representing BJP and became an MLA for the first time winning the 2018 Karnataka Legislative Assembly election. He retained the seat winning the 2023 Karnataka Legislative Assembly election where he polled 57,299 votes and defeated his nearest rival, R.V. Devraj of Indian National Congress by a margin of 12,113 votes.

== Portfolios head ==
- BJP State Executive Member from 2016 to present.
- MLA - from 2018 to present ( Bharatiya Janata Party)

== Awards ==
- Jnanasri Award 2013 - Akhila Karnataka Vipra Vanitha Pratishtana
- Chanakya National Award 2017 - Chaitanya International Arts Academy Trust
- Nadaprabhu Kempe Gowda's Daughter-In-Law Sadhvi Lakshmi Devi Award
- Excellent Entrepreneur Award - Times Group
- Honorary Doctorate for Implementing Affordable Housing for Economically deprived from Desh Bhagat University - Chandigarh, India.
- Parashuram Award - Akhila Karnataka Ramanuja Seva Samiti
