= Agrahar =

Agrahar may refer to:

- Agrahar (Devadurga), a village in Karnataka, India
- Agrahar (Raichur), a village in Karnataka, India

== See also ==
- Agrahari (disambiguation)
- Agrahara (disambiguation)
