= A. Sriramanahalli =

- village
- Location in Karnataka, India A. Sriramanahalli (India)
- Coordinates: 12.824857°N 76.745768°E
- Country: India
- State: Karnataka
- District: Mandya
- Talukas: Nagamangala

Government
  - Body: Village Panchayat

Languages
  - Official: Kannada
- Time zone: UTC+5:30 (IST)
- Nearest city: Mandya
- Civic agency: Village Panchayat

A. Sriramanahalli is a village in the southern state of Karnataka, India. It is located in the Nagamangala taluk of Mandya district in Karnataka.

== See also ==
- Mandya
- Districts of Karnataka
