= A. Shanboganahalli =

- village
- Location in Karnataka, India A. Shanboganahalli (India)
- Coordinates: 12.826531°N 76.76877°E
- Country: India
- State: Karnataka
- District: Mandya
- Talukas: Nagamangala

Government
  - Body: Village Panchayat

Languages
  - Official: Kannada
- Time zone: UTC+5:30 (IST)
- Nearest city: Mandya
- Civic agency: Village Panchayat

A. Shanboganahalli is a village in the southern state of Karnataka, India. It is located in the Nagamangala taluk of Mandya district in Karnataka.

Approximately 150 families live in Shanboganahalli, where the main source of income is through agriculture. Both incense sticks and coconuts are also exported from this village to the city of Mysore. Institutions within the village include the milk dairy, the co-operative bank, the incense factory and the women's self-help group (SAG), which is central to the community. The village has several village leaders, with the most senior being Diwakar.

90% of the families who live in Shanboganahalli have their own toilet. In Autumn 2012 a group of volunteers from the UK came to this village to build 10 new eco-sanitation units for the community. The volunteers lived in Shanboganahalli for 2 months and during this time also delivered health and hygiene education to children in the village. Shanboganahalli has water available through three hand pumps in the village and two water tanks. Electricity is available for a few hours every day.

A popular meeting place for locals is a small corner shop ran by one of the local ladies, Veena. In the shop a small selection of sweets and toiletries are available. Volleyball is a popular sport in the village.

Many farm animals including cows, goats and sheep are found outside the houses in Shanboganahalli.

== See also ==
- Mandya
- Districts of Karnataka
