= Adichunchanagiri Hills =

Adichunchanagiri
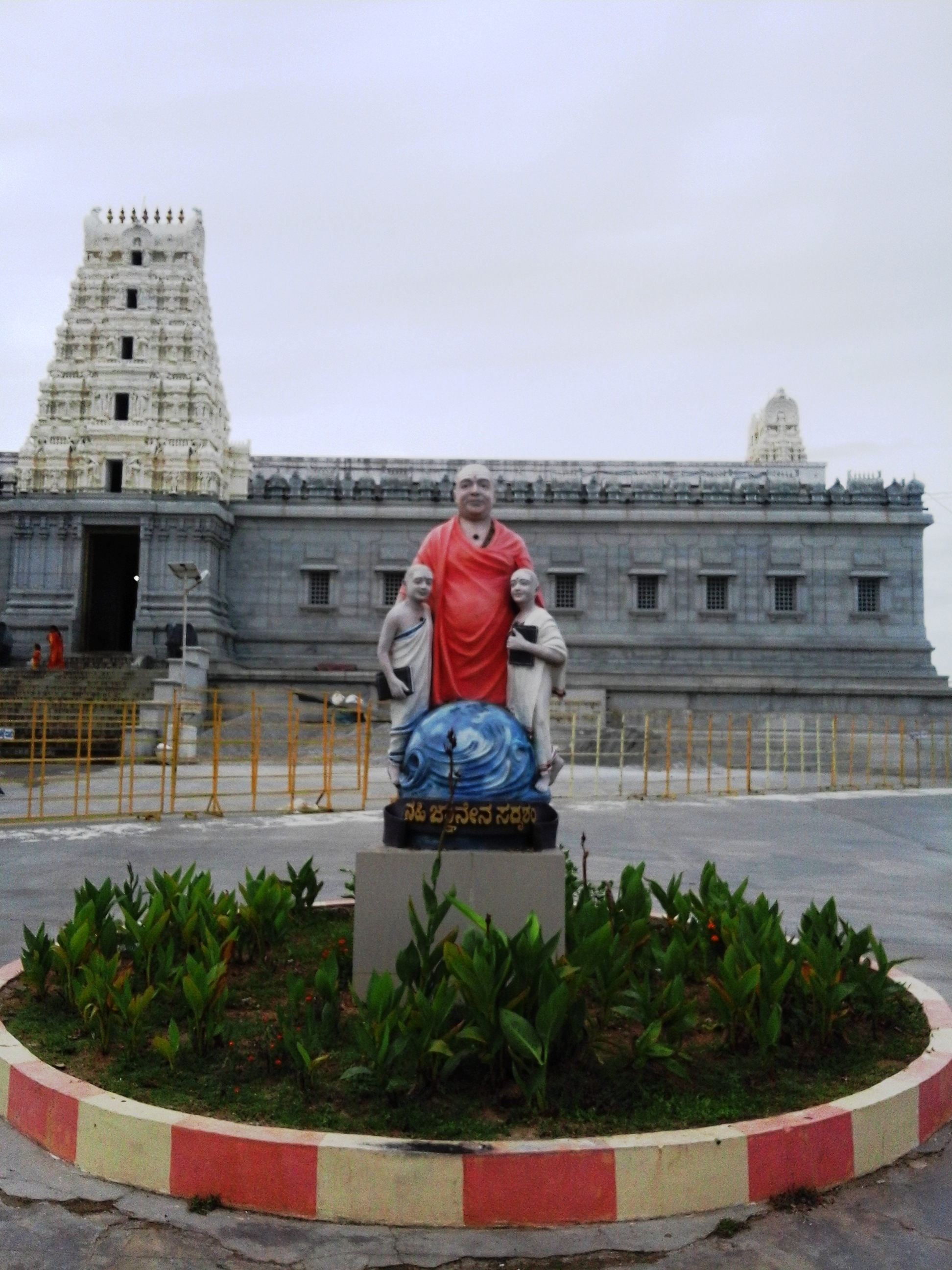
- Adichunchanagiri Temple
- Interactive map of Adichunchanagiri
- Coordinates: 13.02312°N 76.74551°E
- Country: India
- State: Karnataka
- District: Mandya
- Time zone: UTC+5:25 (IST)
- PIN: 571448
- Telephone code: 571433

Adichunchanagiri, also called Mahasamsthana Math, is a hill township in Nagamangala Taluk, Mandya District, Karnataka State, India, 110 km west of the state capital Bangalore, on a rocky hill at an altitude of about 3,300 ft. above sea level.

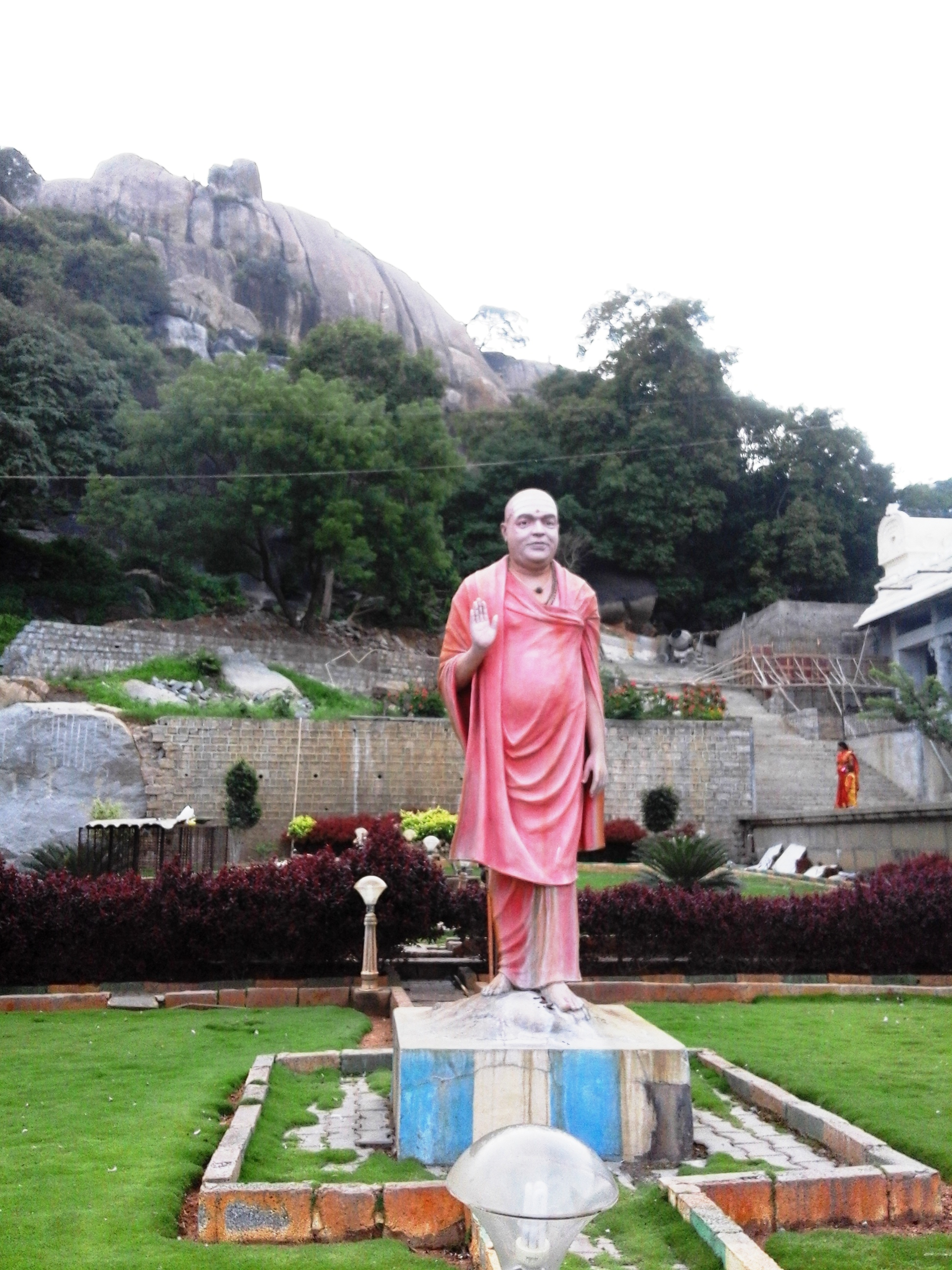
Adichunchanagiri Hills

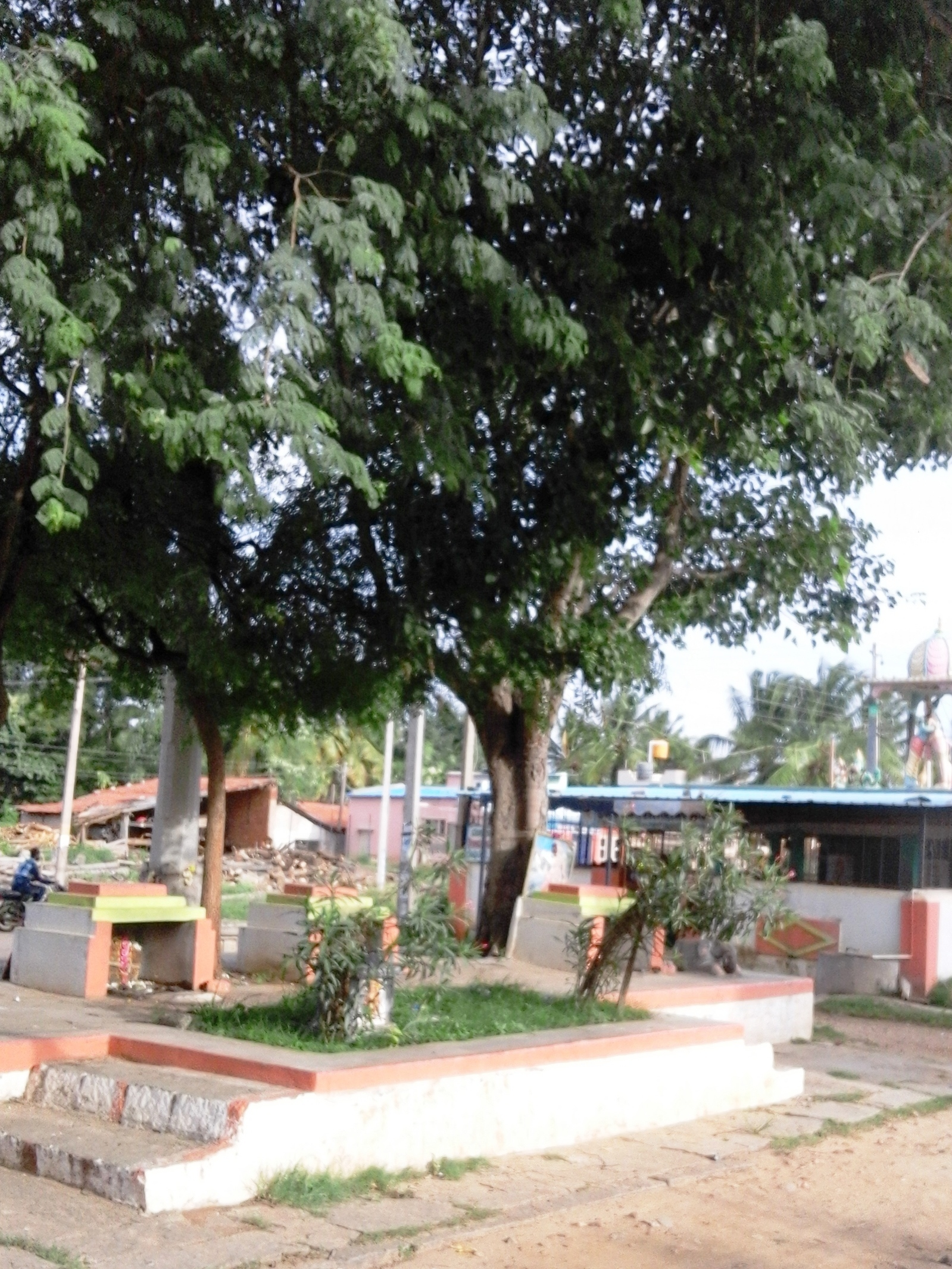
Bellur Cross is the gateway to Adichunchanagiri Hills

== See also ==
- Adichunchanagiri Peacock Wildlife Sanctuary
