= Dadaga =

Dadaga Dadaga
- village
- Location in Karnataka, India Dadaga (India)
- Coordinates: 12°57′31″N 76°41′48″E
- Country: India
- State: Karnataka
- District: Mandya
- Talukas: Nagamangala

Population
  - Total: 843

Languages
  - Official: Kannada
- Time zone: UTC+5:30 (IST)
- PIN: 571418 .
- Vehicle registration: KA11 change nagamangala KA54
- Nearest city: Nagamangala

Dadaga is a village in the southern state of Karnataka, India. It is located in the Nagamangala taluk of Mandya district in Karnataka. A lake and channel of Hemavathi water acts as water supply for irrigation conducted here. Many temples can also be found in this place. Government runs a primary and middle Kannada medium school in Dadaga which educates Dadaga and neighboring villages. Coconuts, mangoes, ragi, paddy (rice), wheat, corn, onions, tomatoes, are some of the plants that are cultivated here.

== Demographics ==
=== Population ===
No of Households 192, Persons 843, Males 400, Females 443.

=== Religion ===
Hindus and Jains are the main natives lives here.

== Cityscape ==
=== Channel ===
Hemavati river irrigation project's canal passes through Dadaga.

=== Flora ===
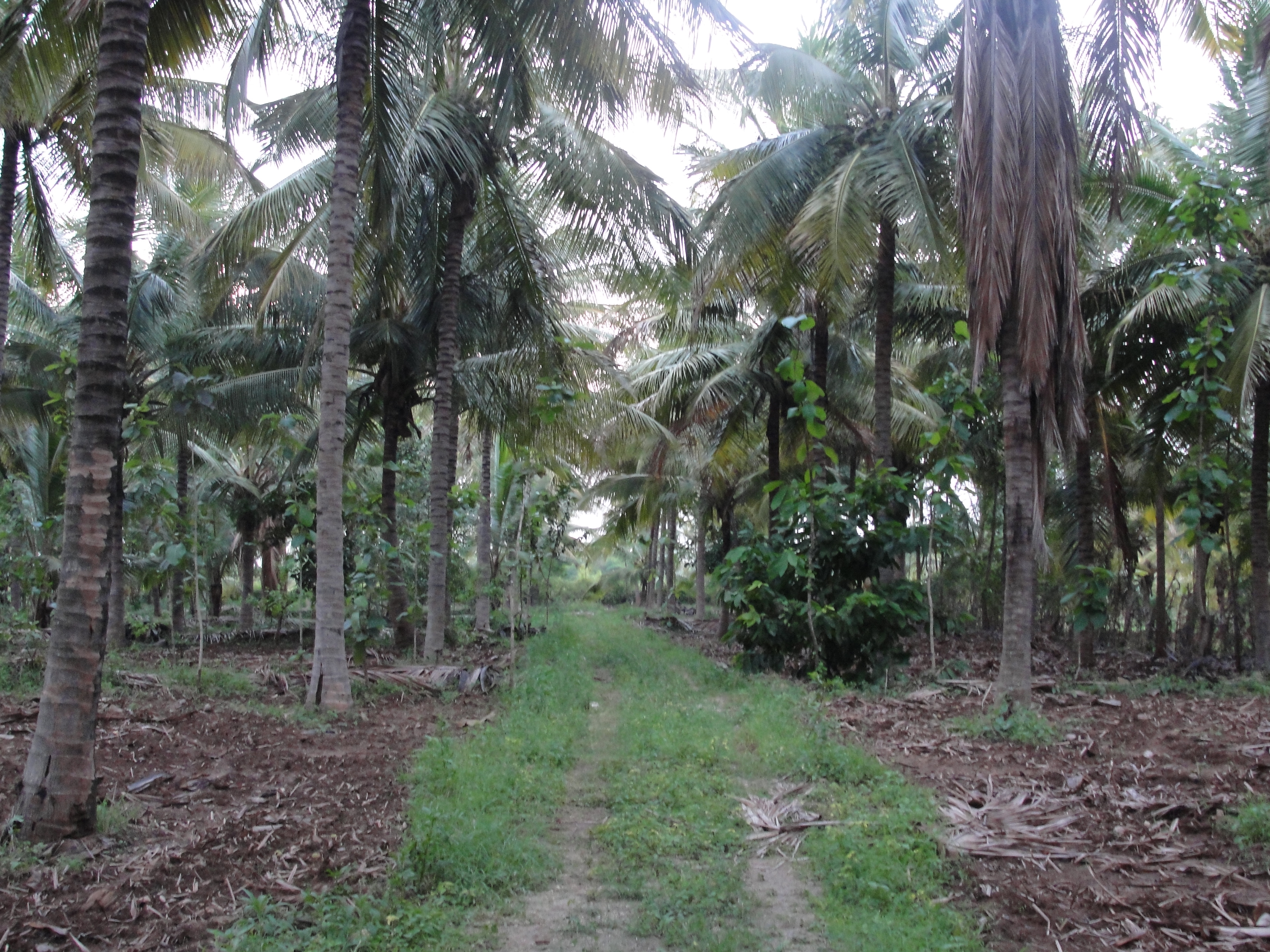
Coconut Garden(ತೆಂಗಿನ ತೋಟ)

Coconut Tree(ತೆಂಗಿನ ಮರ)

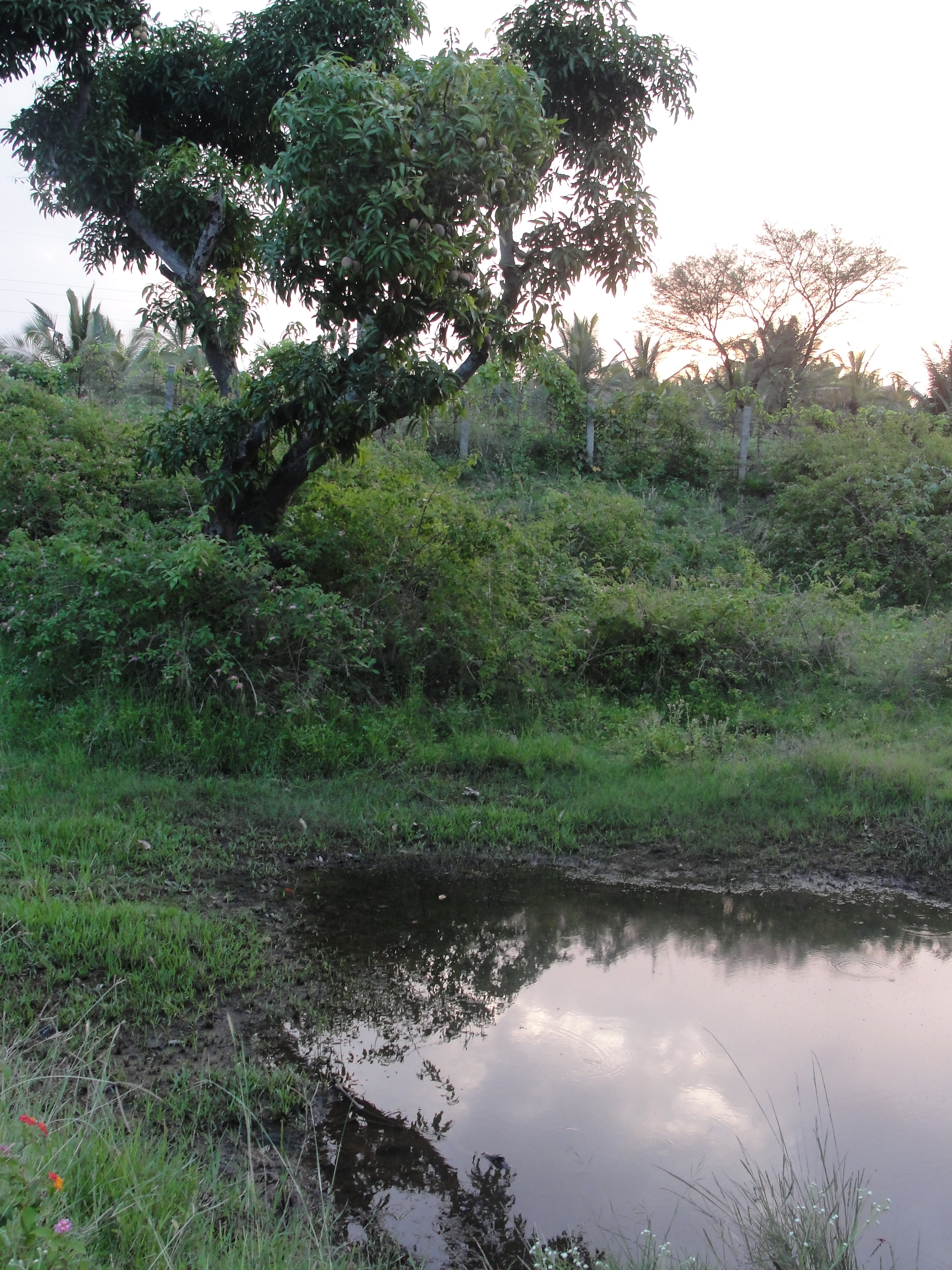
Mango Tree next to Pond

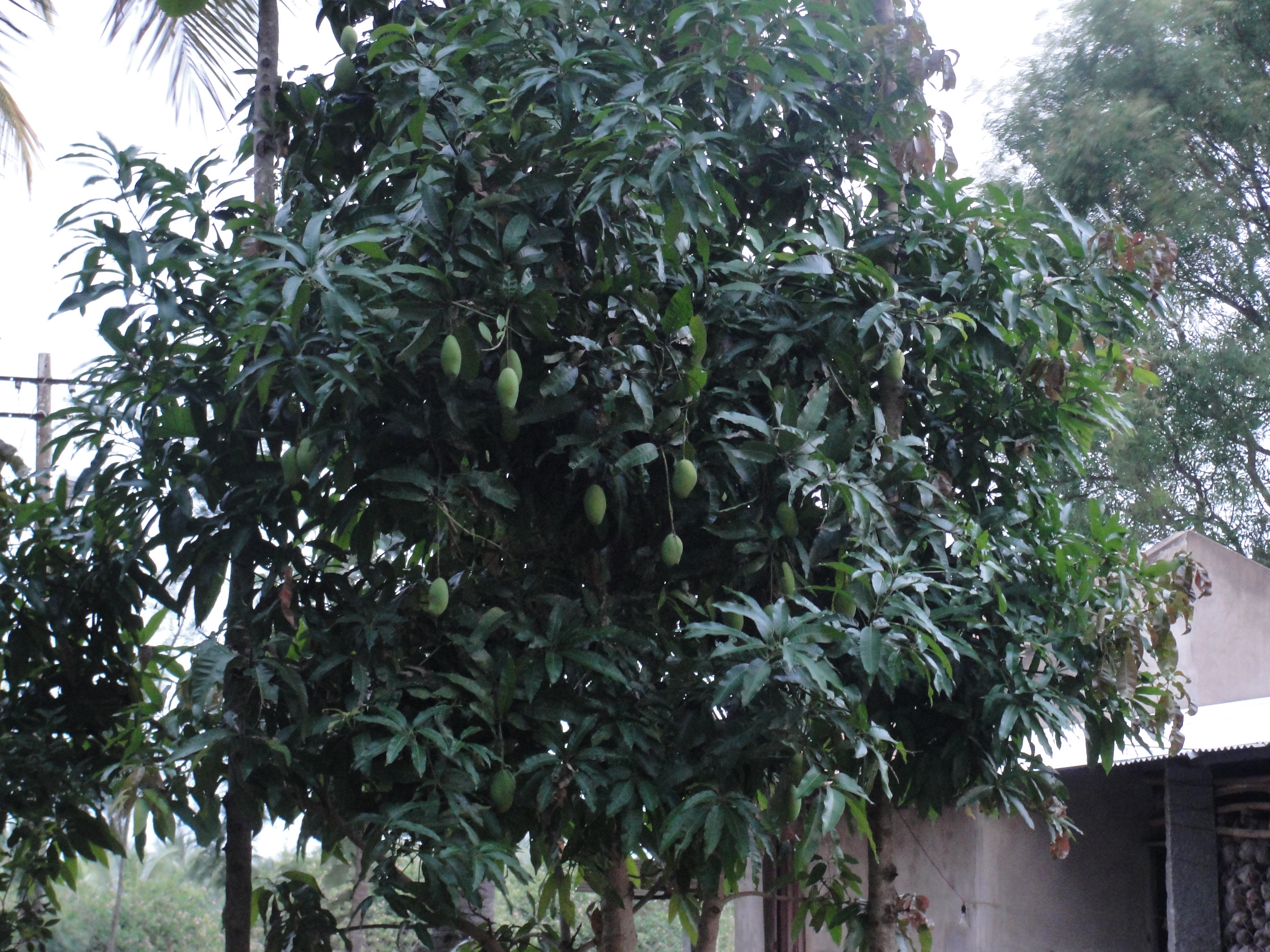
Mango Tree(ಮಾವಿನ ಮರ)

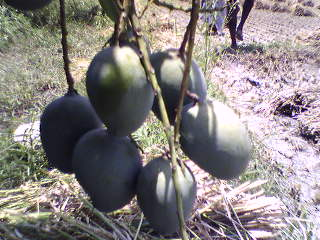
Mangoes(ಮಾವಿನ ಹಣ್ಣುಗಳು)

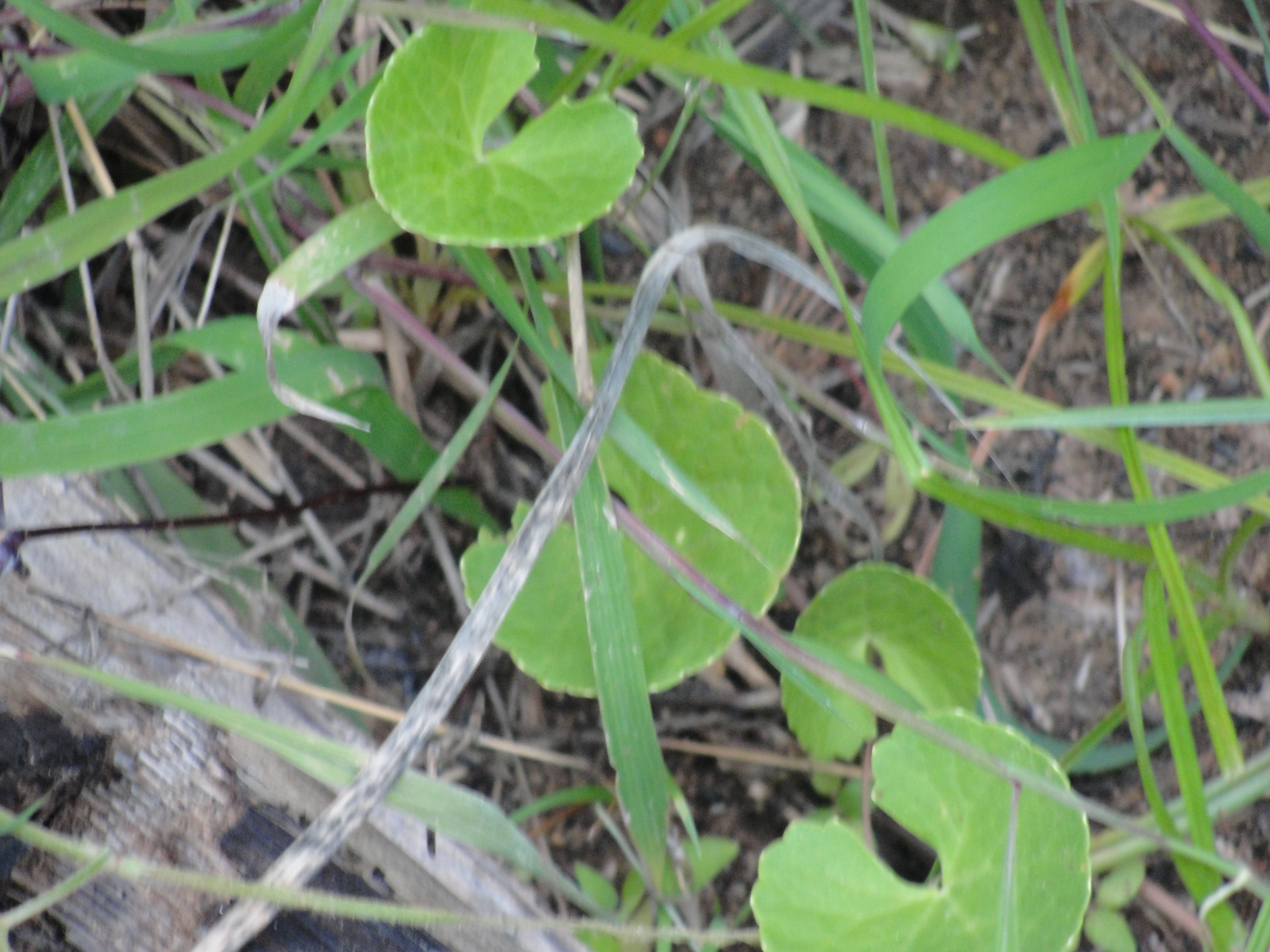
Centella asiatica(Kannada: ಒಂದೆಲಗಳು) ಒಂದೆಲಗ means 'one leaf'

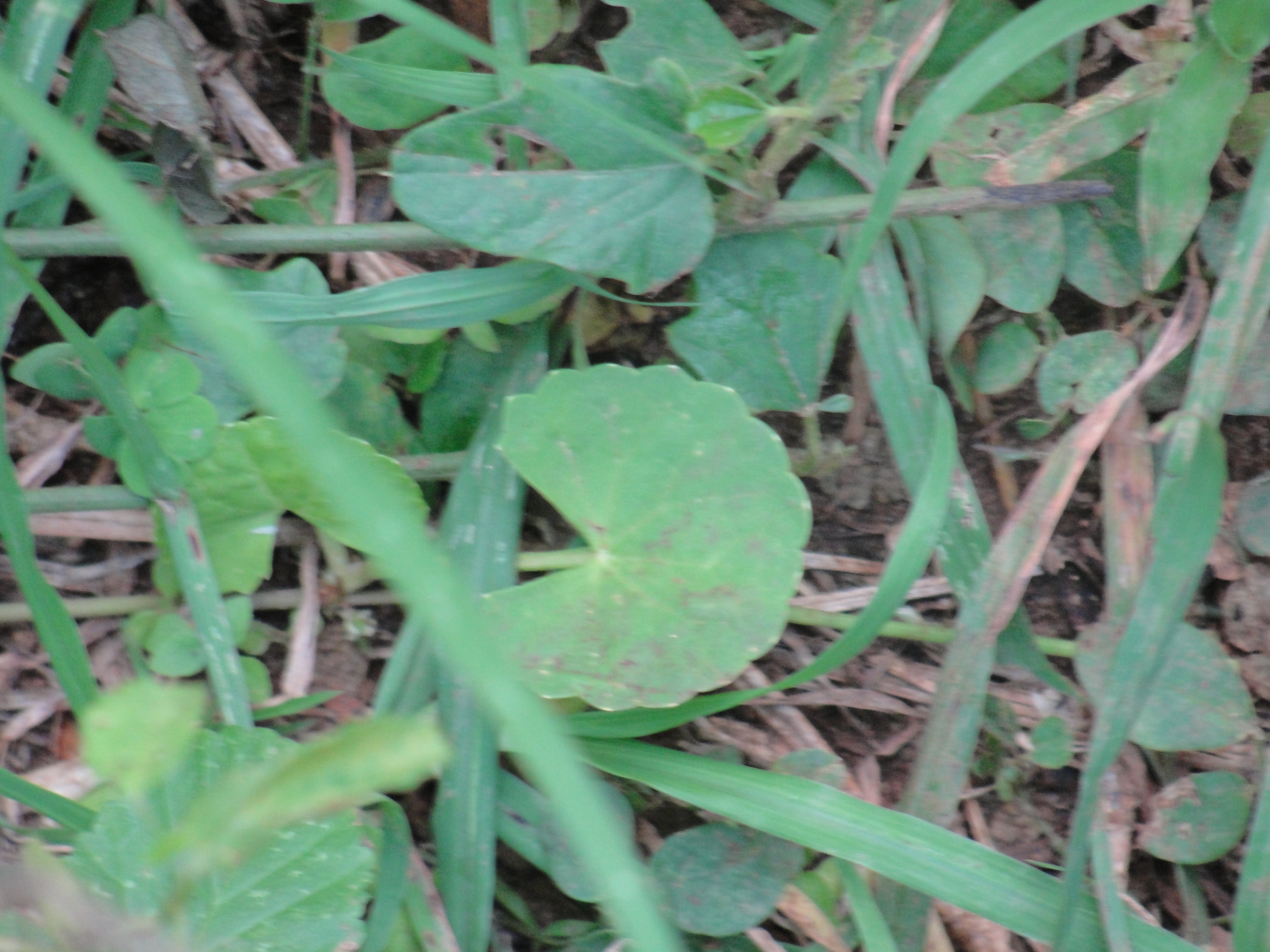
Ondelaga(ಒಂದೆಲಗ)

=== Lakes ===
Dadaga lake overflows into Dasinakera lake of Belluru.

=== Parks ===
A park used to exist here next to the lake few decades ago, but it's not present anymore.

=== Temples ===
==== Shantinath Tirthankar Basadi ====
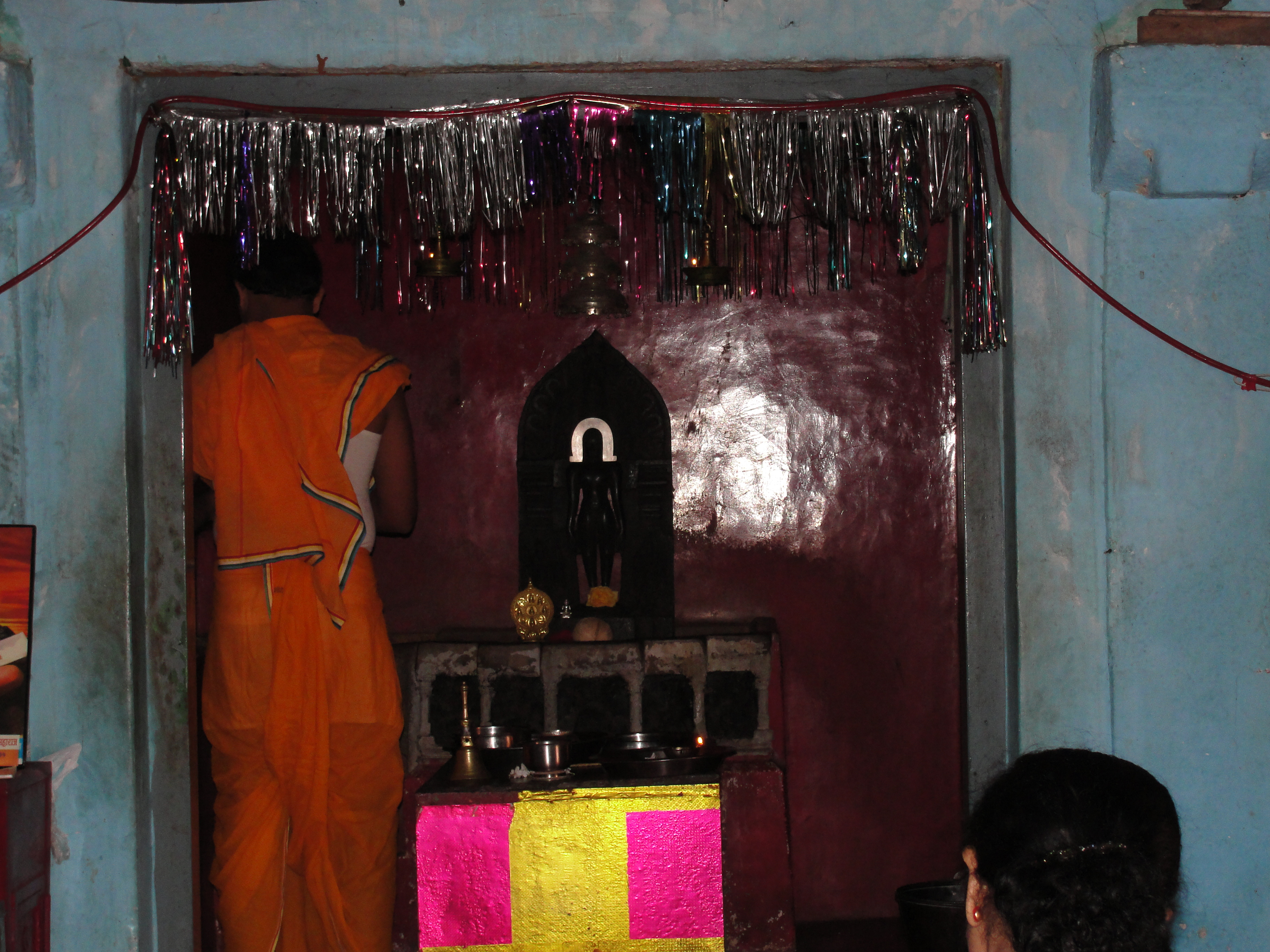
Shantinath Tirtankar Basadi

Shantinath Tirthankar Basadi is one of the major attractions of Dadaga. Main Deity of this temple is a black coloured idol of Bhagawan Shanthinatha in the kayotsarga posture. This temple of Bhagawan Shanthinatha was constructed in 1940.

== See also ==
- List of districts of Karnataka
- States and union territories of India
