= M. N. Singaramma =

Indian writer (1920–2006)

Dr. M. N. Singaramma
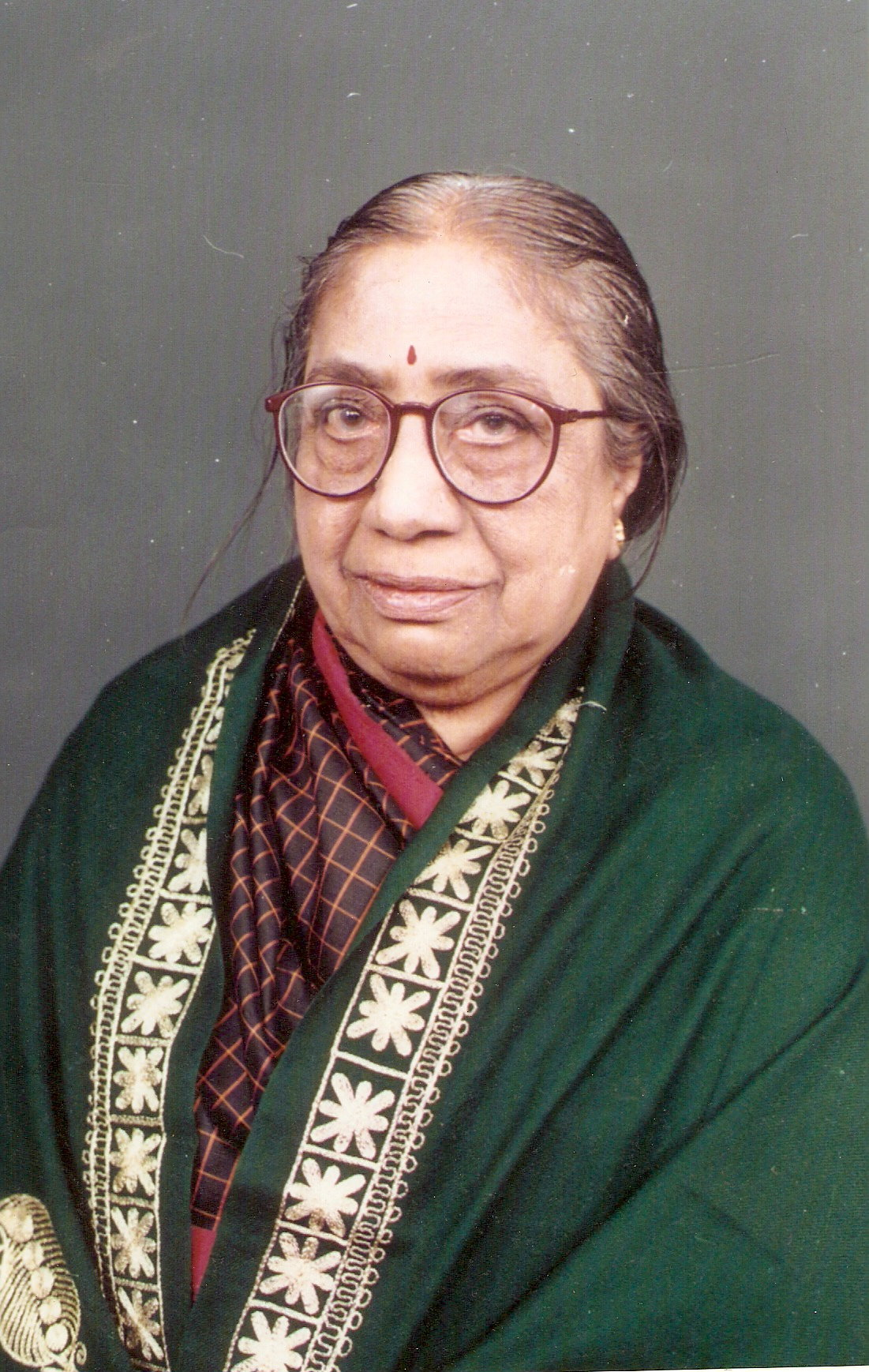
- Born: 1920; Mandya, Karnataka, India
- Died: 2006 (aged 85–86); Mandya, Karnataka, India
- Occupation: Writer

Dr. M. N. Singaramma (1920–2006) was a scholar, writer and social activist from Mandya in Karnataka, Southern India. She wrote many philosophical books and articles under the pen name Sridevi.

Her love for Hindi, despite having been born and brought up in Southern India, earned her a lot of respect and admiration. She is still remembered by scholars working on philosophical and religious texts as a pathbreaker during times when there was no one doing any research on these subjects.

== Educational qualifications ==
- Doctorate in literature (Vidyasagar D.Lit) from Vikramshila Hindi Vidyapeeth, Bagalpur, Bihar
- Sahitya Ratna in Hindi, Sanskrit and Kannada from Prayag Vishwa Vidyalaya, Hindi Sahitya Sammelan, Allahabad.
- ‘Mahamahopadhyaya’ in research work on Indian Philosophy from Prayag Vishwa Vidyalaya, Allahabad.
- Praveen in Hindi from Dakshina Bharatha Hindi Prachar Sabha, Madras.

== Publications ==
- From 1948 to 1984 she wrote over 80 articles in Hindi, Kannada and Tamil on social, philosophical and religious themes.
- She has over 20 books published in Hindi, Kannada and Tamil on religious and philosophical subjects to her credit.
- Her Research papers have been published in Journals and magazines in Hindi, Kannada and Tamil.
- Her well-known books dealing with aspects of South Indian Philosophy like 'Vysnava Bhakti' published in Kannada, ‘Ramanuja Darshana’, ‘Pansharatra Mathhu Itara Agamagalu’, ‘Gopurada Hirime’ have been widely read and acclaimed and part of many libraries in India and abroad.
- She presented many papers and reports at seminars and conferences on South Indian Philosophy and Religion.

== Awards ==
- Listing in Reference Asia – Who is Who of Men and Women of Achievement in 2000
- Letter of Appreciation by former President of USA – Mr. Bill Clinton in May 2000 for the book ‘Philosophy of Pancharatra’
- Awarded the Mahatma Gandhi Hindi Award – 1992 by the Bangalore University Hindi Department for the book ‘Bhakti Siddhanjana’
- Title ‘Vidyavichakshana’ and Silver Shield from Vedavedanta Vyjayanti Vidyalaya, Kancheepuram, Tamil Nadu in 1971.
- Honoured by Mandya District Brahmana Sabha in 1987 and 2002
- Certificate of Appreciation by the Mandya Deputy Commissioner in 2001
- Central Government Fellowship for Literary Scholars since 1987
- Honoured by the Government of Karnataka during Rajyotsava in 1985-86
- Government of Karnataka Honorarium for Literary Scholars since 1982
- Scholarship from Ubhaya Vedanta Sabha, Bangalore
- ‘Swarnajayanti 12’ from Dakshina Bharatha Hindi Prachar Sabha in 1981
- Honoured by Mahila Sahitya Sammelana, Mandya
- National award in Literature and Culture Fellowship in 1983 for work titled ‘Bhakti Siddhanjana’ in Hindi
- Jamunalal Bajaj Award in 1964
- Numerous certificates from prominent scholars, Mathadhipatis, professors and other eminent men in recognition of work on South Indian Philosophy & religion.

== Research work ==
- Research work in Hindi and Kannada Literature since 1968
- Research work in South Indian Philosophy and Religion
- Research work in various Indian languages- Kannada, Tamil, Telugu and Sansjrit
- Research work for the Bibliography project of Sanskrit Research Institute, Melkote for 2 years (1980–1982)
- Research work under the guidance of eminent scholars like Shri. Vellukudy Varadachar Swamy, Nyaya Vedanta Vidvan Karpankad Venkatachariar Swamy, Late P.B.Annagarachar Swamy.

== Social work ==
- Singaramma worked as District Organizer of Zilla Hindi Samiti, Mandya during 1961-71 and District Secretary of Zilla Hindi Prachara Samiti. She participated in the Third Hindi Sammelan at Delhi in 1983.
- She worked for Kannada Sahitya Parishad, Bangalore as Member for 20 years and conducted lectures and articles during the Women's Year.
- She established ‘Hindi Kannada Vidyalaya’ at Mandya and conducted classes for women in Hindi and Kannada for over 30 years.
- She was the Honorary Secretary working committee member and member of Mahila Samaja for over 25 years. She conducted music classes, coaching classes in Hindi, Crafts and tailoring classes for women, condensed course for women in matriculation.

She primarily worked for educating and uplifting of women's status and enabling them to independently earn a living.

== Gallery ==
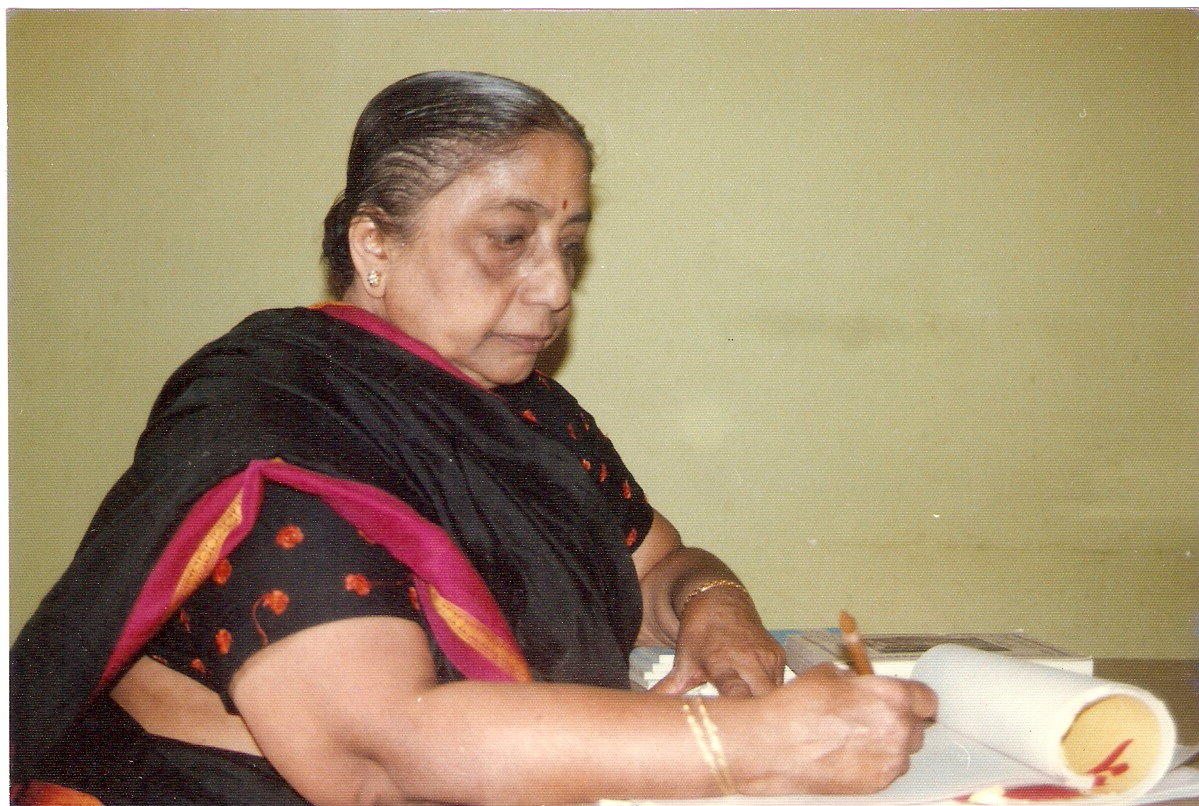
Dr.M.N.Singaramma writing at her desk

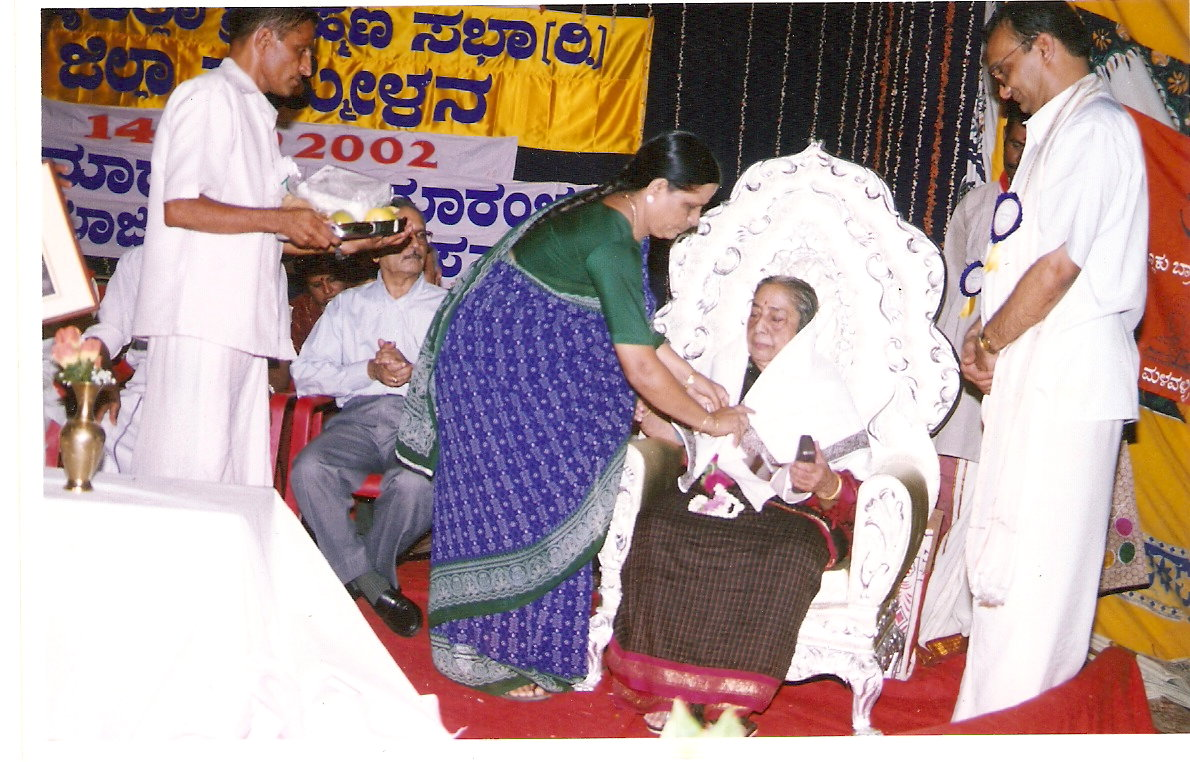
Dr.M.N.Singaramma felicitated by Mandya Brahman Sabha, 2004

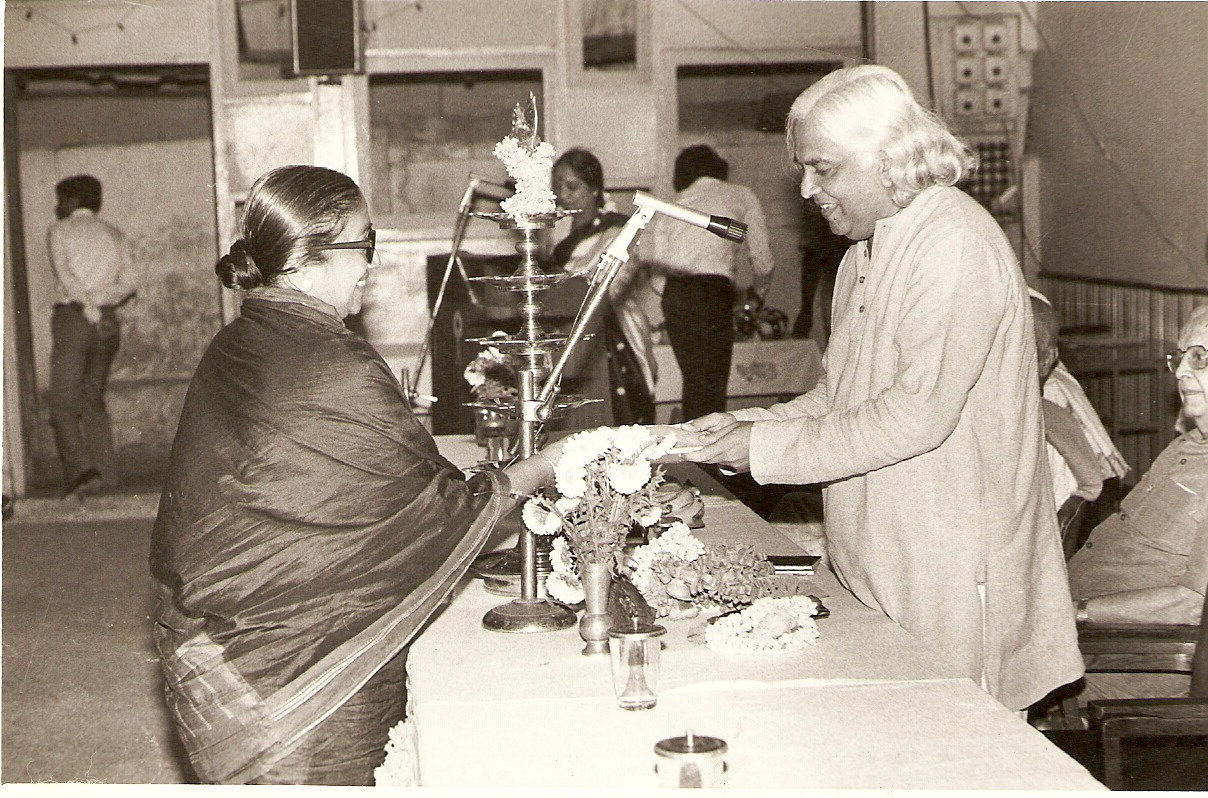
Dr.M.N.Singaramma receiving award from H.M.Nayak

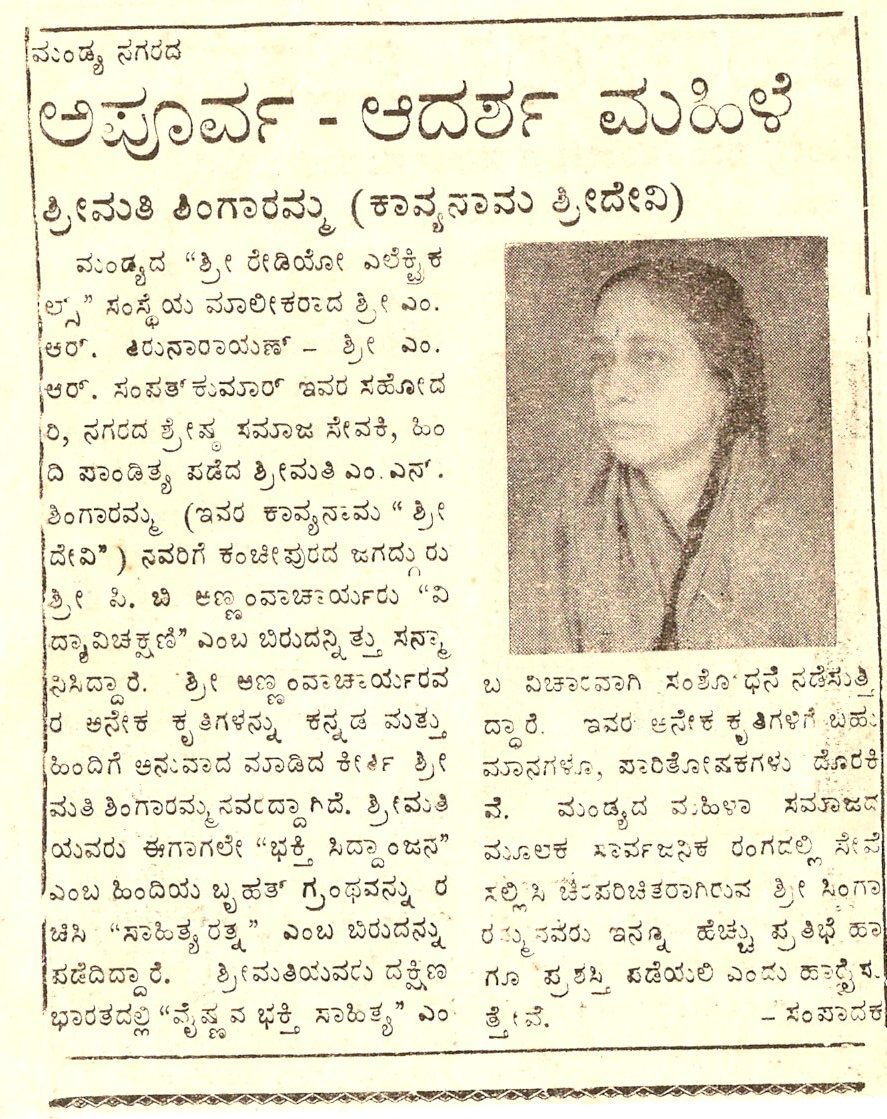
Write-up about Dr.M.N.Singaramma in 'Kolalu' newspaper
