= Palahalli =

Palahalli Palahally
- Village
- Location in Karnataka, India Palahalli (India)
- Coordinates: 12°24′50″N 76°39′10″E
- Country: India
- State: Karnataka
- District: Mandya
- Talukas: Shrirangapattana

Population (2001)
  - Total: 7,000+

Languages
  - Official: Kannada
- Time zone: UTC+5:30 (IST)

Palahalli is a village in the southern state of Karnataka, India. It is located in the Shrirangapattana taluk of Mandya district in Karnataka. It is known for having the first sugar factory being built when it was a British colony.

== Demographics ==
As of 2001 India census, Palahalli had a population of 6763 with 3478 males and 3285 females.

== See also ==
- Mandya
- Districts of Karnataka
