= Santhekasalagere =

- village
- Location in Karnataka, India Santhekasalagere (India)
- Coordinates: 12°29′50″N 76°53′16″E
- Country: India
- State: Karnataka
- District: Mandya
- Talukas: Mandya

Population (2001)
  - Total: 6,773

Languages
  - Official: Kannada
- Time zone: UTC+5:30 (IST)

Santhekasalagere is a village in the southern state of Karnataka, India. It is located in the Mandya taluk of Mandya district in Karnataka.

== Demographics ==
As of the 2001 Census of India, Santhekasalagere had a population of 6,773, consisting of 3,450 males and 3,323 females.

== See also ==
- Mandya
- Districts of Karnataka
