= Achappana Koppalu =

- village
- Interactive map of Achappana Koppalu
- Coordinates: 12.4444°N 76.6714°E
- Country: India
- State: Karnataka
- District: Mandya
- Talukas: Shrirangapattana

Government
  - Body: Village Panchayat

Languages
  - Official: Kannada
- Time zone: UTC+5:30 (IST)
- Nearest city: Mandya
- Civic agency: Village Panchayat

Achappana Koppalu is a village in the southern state of Karnataka, India. It is located in the Shrirangapattana taluk of Mandya district in Karnataka.

ಶ್ರೀರಂಗಪಟ್ಟಣದಿಂದ ಸುಮಾರು 6 ಕಿಲೋ ಮೀಟರ್ ಇದಇದು ಕಾವೇರಿ ನದಿಯ ಎಡ ದಂಡೆಯ ಮೇಲಿದೆ.ೆ.

== See also ==
- Mandya
- Districts of Karnataka
