= Echagere =

Village in Mandya District, Karnataka, India

Coordinates: 12°37′13.46″N 76°57′15.3″E

Echagere is a small village located in Karnataka state, Mandya District and block, Hodaghatta panchayat. It is 12 kilometres (7.5 mi) north-east of the city of Mandya. Neighbouring villages include Keelara and Hodaghatta. Echagere is sometimes spelled "Eachagere". Under Eachagere, the India Census of 2011 gives the village a population of 1,352.
