= Budanur =

Hosabudanur
- village
- Location in Karnataka, India Hosabudanur (India)
- Coordinates: 12.55003°N 76.9581800°E
- Country: India
- State: Karnataka
- District: Mandya
- Talukas: Mandya

Population (2001)
  - Total: 6,936

Languages
  - Official: Kannada
- Time zone: UTC+5:30 (IST)

Budanur is a village in the southern state of Karnataka, India. It is located in the Mandya taluk of Mandya district in Karnataka.

Anantha Padmanabha Temple and Kashi Vishwanatha Temple are 13th century Hoysala era temples, which are still functional in the village.

== Demographics ==
As of 2001 India census, Budanur had a population of 6936 with 3460 males and 3476 females.

== See also ==
- Mandya
- Districts of Karnataka
