= Dodda Chikkana Halli =

Dodda Chikkana Halli is a village in the southern state of Karnataka, India. It is located in the Nagamangala taluk of Mandya district in Karnataka.
