= Achamanahalli =

Chamanahalli Chamanahalli
- Village, Part of Bannur Municipality
- Location in Karnataka, India Chamanahalli (India)
- Coordinates: 12.3394569°N 76.8800231°E
- Country: India
- State: Karnataka
- District: Mysuru
- Taluks: T Narasipura

Government
  - Type: Private Party led by Mr. Suresh CS who heads the Gram Panchayat.
  - Body: Bannur Municipal Corporation

Languages
  - Official: Kannada
- Time zone: UTC+5:30 (IST)
- Postal code: 571101
- Vehicle registration: KA55
- Nearest city: Mysuru
- Civic agency: Bannur Corporation

Chamanahalli is a village in the southern state of Karnataka, India. It is located in the T Narasipura taluk of Mysuru district in Karnataka.

== See also ==
- Mysuru
- Mandya
- Districts of Karnataka
