= Keelara =

Village in Mandya taluk, Karnataka

- village
- Location in Karnataka, India Keelara (India)
- Coordinates: 12°35′48″N 76°56′26.5″E
- Country: India
- State: Karnataka
- District: Mandya
- Talukas: Mandya

Population (2001)
  - Total: 5,263

Languages
  - Official: Kannada
- Time zone: UTC+5:30 (IST)

Keelara is a village in the southern state of Karnataka, India. It is located in the Mandya taluk of Mandya district. The village is around 10 km from Mandya city and 96 km from the capital city of Karnataka via NH-275.

== Demographics ==
As of 2001 India census, Keelara had a population of 5263 with 2629 males and 2634 females.

== Notable people ==
Sri. K. V. Shankaragowda - politician, known as Nitya Sachiva (lit. 'Minister forever')

Prof K M Veerappa, Principal(Retd.) Yuvarajas College, Mysore.

Sri.K L Anandegowda- Town planner. Retired Director of Town planning, Govt.of Karnataka.

Sri.K T Veerappa- Retired Director, Prasaranga, Uni. of Mysore.

Dr T.Chandrashkar, Bangalore.

Sri.K L Mariswamy, Retired Prof., Govt.College of Pharmacy, Bangalore.

Dr K L Mahadevappa, Retired Prof., of Biochemistry, KIMS, Bangalore.

Sri. KV Chandramouli, Retired Deputy Director of Boilers, Government of Karnataka.

Dr. Babu Veeregowda, Vice-President, HNTB, NewYork.

== Nearby villages ==
Echagere - 3 kilometres (1.9 mi) north-east

== See also ==
- Mandya
- Districts of Karnataka
