= Bindiganavile =

Prasanna Channakeshava temple
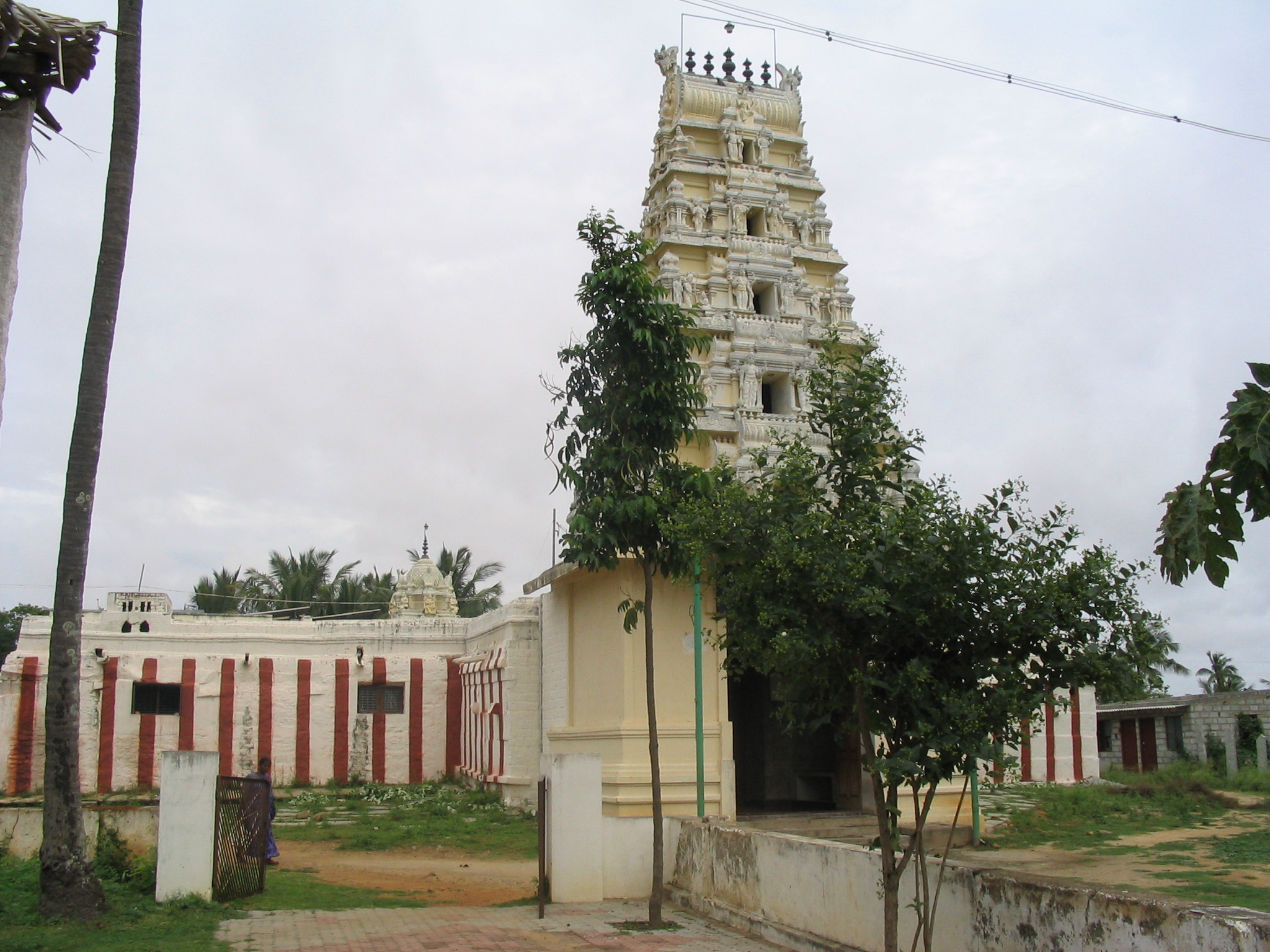

- Location in Karnataka

Religion
- Affiliation: Hinduism
- Deity: Prasanna Channakeshava; Sowmya Nayaki

Location
- State: Karnataka
- Country: India
- Interactive map of Prasanna Channakeshava temple
- Coordinates: 12°52′53″N 76°38′2″E

Architecture
- Type: Dravidian architecture

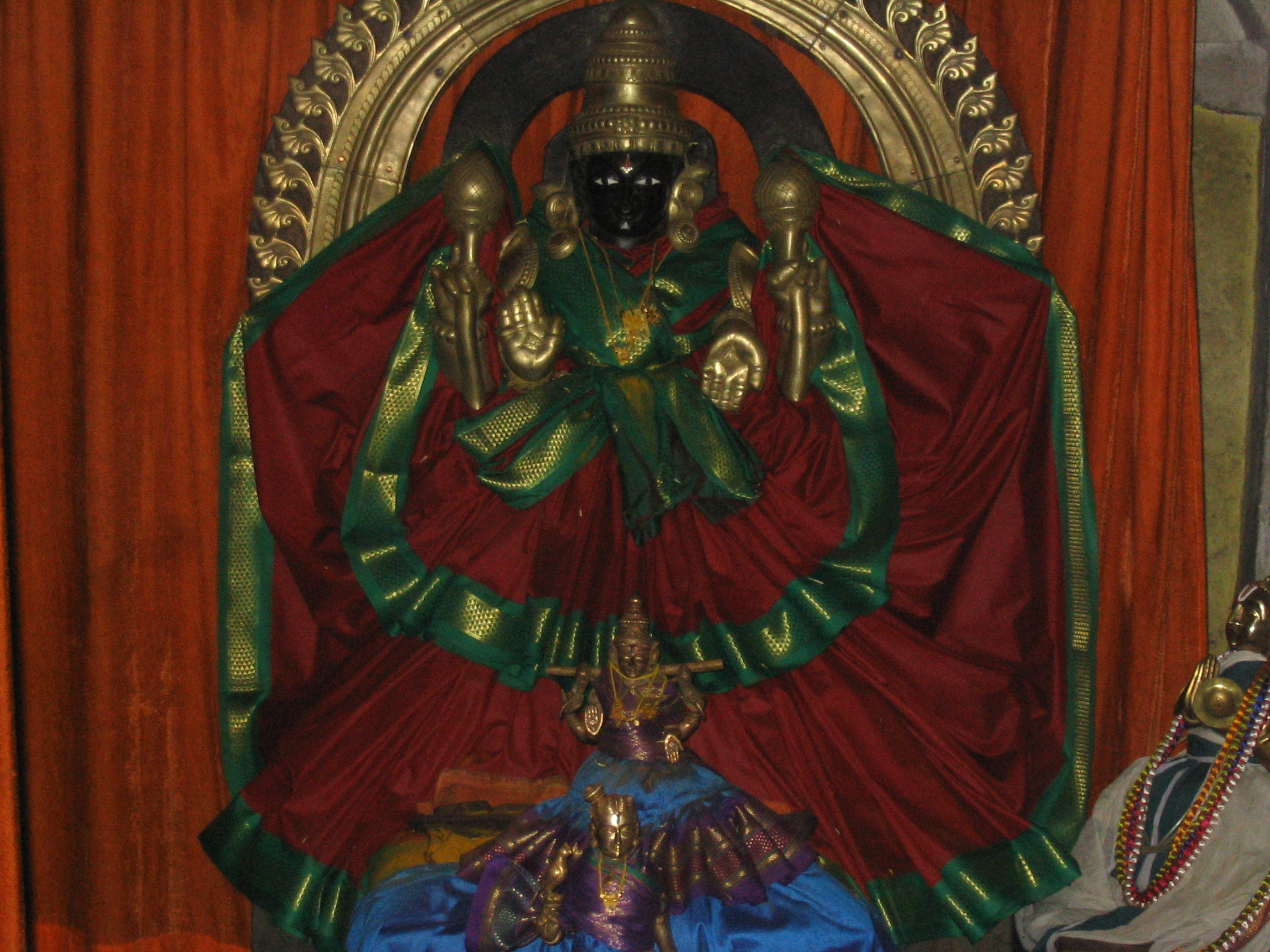
Image of the main deity, Prasanna Channakeshava

Bindiganavale is a village and hobli headquarters in Nagamangala taluka of Mandya district, Karnataka, India. It is about 50 kilometres (31 mi) from Mandya and 130 km (81 mi) from Bangalore. It has a Vaishnava temple dedicated to Garuda who is worshipped here as Vainatheyar. The main deities in the temple are Prasanna Channakeshava and Sowmyanayaki.
