= Agrahari (disambiguation) =

Agrahari is a Hindu Bania community.

== People ==
Agrahari is also a surname. Notable people with the surname include:

- Birendra Agrahari, Nepalese playback singer
- Amrita Agrahari, MP, Nepal
- Chandrama Devi Agrahari
- Brijesh Kumar Gupta, MP, Nepal
- Sitaram Agrahari, Nepalese journalist

== Other ==
- Agrahari Sikh, a Sikh community in India

== See also ==
- Agrahar (disambiguation)
