= Agrahara Bachahalli =

Agrahara Bachahalli Dhanabachahalli
- village
- Agrahara Bachahalli is in Mandya district
- Country: India
- State: Karnataka
- District: Mandya
- Talukas: Krishnarajpet

Government
  - Body: Village Panchayat

Languages
  - Official: Kannada
- Time zone: UTC+5:30 (IST)
- Nearest city: K.R.Pete/Mandya
- Civic agency: Village Panchayat

Agrahara Bachahalli is a village in the southern state of the Indian state of Karnataka. It is located in the Krishnarajpet taluk of Mandya district.

Agrahara Bachahalli is one of the most prosperous towns from the Hoysala period.

== Monuments ==
A unique monument found there is the Garuda Lenka Sthambas (Pillars), also known as "the hero stones" and dedicated to Hoysala Garuda Pace (soldiers who handle every situation). The Hero stones at Agrahara Bachahalli number around 11 and are almost 800 years old. As per inscriptions on these pillars, the family (or) individuals in whose name the stones were installed served the Hoysala rulers from the times of King Ereyanga (1098–1102). Many inscriptions survive from the time of King Veera Ballala II (1173–1220).

== Culture ==
It is home to numerous temples built during the Hoysala and Chola Periods. The "Huniseshwara Temple" is the most prominent and well-maintained temple there. It was constructed in the name of Hunasenayaka.

- Agrahara Bachahalli is also famous for other temples built in the period of Hoysala and Chola kingdoms:
- Sri Lakshmi Devi Ammanavara Temple - Known as Bachalamma (Due to place name Agrahara Bachehalli / Daanabachehalli she will be call it as Bachalamma) and she is the "Kshetradevate(ಗ್ರಾಮದೇವತೆ)"
- Lord Sri Channakeshava temple (the beloved and worshipped god from Hoysala Dynasty in their ruling period).
- Lord Sri Amrutheshwara Temple - Built by Chola Kingdom, because Cholas used to believe Shiva to be the most widely quoted.
- Lord Sri Bhairaveshwara Temple - Built in the period of Hoysala only and believed from surrounding village people.
- Lord Prasanna Abhaya Veeranjaneya Temple - Very recently temple been constructed & inaugurated in our village gate in the year 2024. The god faced towards East & single statue built with Prabhavali. Hanuman looks like in Veera bhangi & the right hand shows his abhaya to devotees.

== See also ==
- Mandya
- Districts of Karnataka
