= Hodaghatta =

Coordinates: 12.6275°N 76.9510°E

Hodaghatta is a village situated in Mandya Taluk, Mandya district, Karnataka, India. The 2011 India Census records a population of 1,152 for Hodaghatta. It has pincode 571450. The village of Echagere is one kilometre (0.6 mile) to the south-east.
