= Adichunchanagiri Peacock Wildlife Sanctuary =

Peacock sanctuary in Karnataka, India

- IUCN category IV (habitat/species management area)
- Location within Karnataka
- Interactive map of Adichunchanagiri Peacock Wildlife Sanctuary
- Location: Nagamangala Taluk, Mandya district, Karnataka, India
- Nearest city: Nagamangala
- Coordinates: 12.5745°N 76.6390°E
- Area: 0.88 km^{2} (0.34 sq mi)
- Established: 1981
- Governing body: Department of Forest, Ecology & Environment, Government of Karnataka

Adichunchanagiri Peacock Wildlife Sanctuary—also called Mayuravana ("Peafowl Forest") is a protected area situated in the Adichunchanagiri Hills near the Chunchunagiri Temple in Nagamangala Taluk, Mandya district in the Indian state of Karnataka. It along with Choolannuar are the only sanctuary in India declared specifically for the protection of the Indian peafowl.

== History and designation ==
It was established in 1981 and covers an areaof 0.94 km2. On 5 August 2024, Union Minister for Environment, Forest and Climate Change Bhupender Yadav announced in the Lok Sabha that Adichunchanagiri in Karnataka (and Choolannuar in Kerala) had been formally declared as Peacock Sanctuaries. He also noted the establishment of dedicated peacock breeding and conservation centres to bolster wild populations.

== Geography and habitat ==
The 217-acre (0.88 km²) sanctuary consists of undulating granite tors, tropical dry deciduous scrub and southern thorn scrub. Five seasonal streams and three perennial waterholes support both peafowl and other wildlife. Pockets of native Vachellia, Albizia, Terminalia, Azadirachta and Ficus persist amidst former eucalyptus plantations.

== Biodiversity ==
Designated an Important Bird Area, it supports 59 species of dry-zone scrub birds, notably a thriving population of Indian peafowl. Other key species include yellow-throated bulbul (Pycnonotus xantholaemus), small green-billed malkoha (Phaenicophaeus viridirostris), white-cheeked barbet (Psilopogon viridis), Loten's sunbird (Cinnyris lotenius) and Jerdon's nightjar (Caprimulgus atripennis).

Despite its small size, the sanctuary hosts sloth bear (Melursus ursinus), blackbuck (Antilope cervicapra), bonnet macaque, fruit bat, jungle cat, a hare, and common mongoose. A 1991 survey by Prasad et al. documented this diversity and praised temple authorities' role in wildlife protection.

== Conservation and management ==
Pilgrim visitation peaks during festivals (up to 50,000 devotees), placing pressure on edible shrubs like Securinega leucopyrus. Temple trustees and the Forest Department regulate pilgrim movement and village livestock grazing to mitigate habitat disturbance.

In August 2024, the Central Government's formal declaration under Section 18 of the Wildlife Protection Act enhanced legal protection and increased funding for habitat restoration and anti-poaching patrols.

== Tourism and access ==
Open daily 08:00–17:00. Best visited October–March. Accessible by road: ~110 km from Bengaluru via NH 75 to Nagamangala, then 12 km on local roads. No accommodation within sanctuary; nearest lodging at Nagamangala and Chunchanagiri Matha guesthouses.
