= Agrahara Palya =

- village
- Agrahara Palya is in Bangalore district
- Country: India
- State: Karnataka
- District: Bangalore
- Talukas: Bangalore North

Government
  - Body: Village Panchayat

Languages
  - Official: Kannada
- Time zone: UTC+5:30 (IST)
- PIN: 562 123
- Nearest city: Bangalore
- Civic agency: Village Panchayat

Agrahara Palya is a village in the southern state of Karnataka, India. It is located in the Bangalore North taluk of Bangalore district.

== Demographics ==
As of 2011 India census, Agrahara Palya had a population of 225. Males constitute 101 of the population and females 124. Kannada is the official and most widely spoken language in Agrahara Palya. Agrahara Palya has an average literacy rate of 75.56 percent, higher than the national average of 59.5 percent, with 76.61 percent of the males and 74.26 percent of females literate.
