= Annalagraharam =

- Town
- Location in Tamil Nadu, India Annalagraharam (India)
- Coordinates: 10°56′35″N 79°22′49″E
- Country: India
- State: Tamil Nadu
- District: Thanjavur

Population (2001)
  - Total: 6,266

Languages
  - Official: Tamil
- Time zone: UTC+5:30 (IST)

Annalagraharam is a Town in the Kumbakonam taluk (municipality) of the Thanjavur district in the state of Tamil Nadu in southeastern India.

== Demographics ==
According to the 2001 census, Annalagraharam had a total population of 6266, of which 3172 are male and 3094 female. The sex ratio was .975/1, females to males. The literacy rate was 77.76.
