= Konappana Agrahara =

- village
- Interactive map of Konappana Agrahara
- Country: India
- State: Karnataka
- District: Bangalore Urban
- Talukas: Bangalore South

Government
  - Type: Panchayata raj
  - Body: Gram panchayat

Population (2015)
  - Total: 11,038

Languages
  - Official: Kannada
- Time zone: UTC+5:30 (IST)
- ISO 3166 code: IN-KA
- Vehicle registration: KA
- Website: karnataka.gov.in

Konappana Agrahara is a village in the southern state of Karnataka, India. It is located in the Bangalore South taluk of Bangalore Urban district in Karnataka. This area is within Electronic City and is adjacent to Infosys Limited and Hewlett Packard. As of 2001 India census, Konappana Agrahara had a population of 11038 with 6659 males and 4379 females.
