= Agrahar (Raichur) =

- village
- Country: India
- State: Karnataka
- District: Raichur
- Talukas: Raichur

Government
  - Body: Village Panchayat

Languages
  - Official: Kannada
- Time zone: UTC+5:30 (IST)
- Vehicle registration: KA
- Nearest city: Raichur
- Civic agency: Village Panchayat
- Website: karnataka.gov.in

Agrahar (Raichur) is a village in the southern state of Karnataka, India. It is located in the Raichur taluk of Raichur district.

== See also ==
- Raichur
- Districts of Karnataka
