= Pallipalayam Agraharam =

- Town
- Location in Tamil Nadu, India
- Coordinates: 11°23′38″N 77°44′35″E
- Country: India
- State: Tamil Nadu
- District: Namakkal or Near Erode

Population (2001)
  - Total: 13,829

Languages
  - Official: Tamil
- Time zone: UTC+5:30 (IST)
- PIN: 638 006, 638 007, 638 008
- Telephone code: 0424, 04288
- Vehicle registration: TN 34

Pallipalayam Agraharam is a census town in Namakkal district, in the Indian state of Tamil Nadu.

It is located across the Kaveri River from Erode City, at a distance of about 7 km from Erode Junction and 4 km from the Erode bus stand.

== Demographics ==
As of the 2001 India census, Pallipalayam Agraharam had a population of 10,829. Males constitute 52% of the population and females 48%. In Pallipalayam Agraharam, 10% of the population is under six years of age.

== Schools ==
Rathna Matriculation School is located on the Komarapalayam main road very near to the Agraharam bus stop.

Vignesh primary and nursery school is located near the bus stop.
