= Agrahara, Kadur =

Agrahara
- village
- Agrahara, Kadur is in Chikkamagaluru district
- Country: India
- State: Karnataka
- District: Chikkamagaluru
- Talukas: Kadur

Government
  - Body: Village Panchayat

Languages
  - Official: Kannada
- Time zone: UTC+5:30 (IST)
- Nearest city: Chikmagalur
- Civic agency: Village Panchayat

Agrahara, Kadur is a village in the southern state of Karnataka, India. It is located in the Kadur taluk of Chikkamagaluru district in Karnataka.

== See also ==
- Chikmagalur
- Districts of Karnataka
