= Agrahara, Chiknayakanhalli =

Agrahara
- village
- Agrahara, Chiknayakanhalli is in Tumkur district
- Interactive map of Agrahara
- Coordinates: 13.901°N 76.982°E
- Country: India
- State: Karnataka
- District: Tumkur
- Talukas: Chiknayakanhalli

Government
  - Body: Village Panchayat

Languages
  - Official: Kannada
- Time zone: UTC+5:30 (IST)
- Nearest city: Tumkur
- Civic agency: Village Panchayat

Agrahara, Chiknayakanhalli is a village in the southern state of Karnataka, India. It is located in the Chikkanayakana Halli taluk of Tumkur district in Karnataka.

== See also ==
- Tumkur
- List of districts of Karnataka
