= Agrahara, Chintamani =

- village
- Location in Karnataka, India Agrahara, Chintamani (India)
- Coordinates: 13.058710°N 78.0049300°E
- Country: India
- State: Karnataka
- District: Chikkaballapur
- Talukas: Chintamani

Government
  - Body: Village Panchayat

Languages
  - Official: Kannada
- Time zone: UTC+5:30 (IST)
- Nearest city: Kolar
- Civic agency: Village Panchayat

Agrahara, Chintamani is a village in the southern state of Karnataka, India. It is located in the Chintamani taluk of Chikkaballapur district in Karnataka.

== See also ==
- Kolar, Karnataka
- Districts of Karnataka
