= Agrahara, Hosadurga =

Agrahara
- village
- Agrahara (Hosadurga) is in Chitradurga district
- Country: India
- State: Karnataka
- District: Chitradurga
- Talukas: Hosadurga

Government
  - Body: Village Panchayat

Languages
  - Official: Kannada
- Time zone: UTC+5:30 (IST)
- Nearest city: Chitradurga
- Civic agency: Village Panchayat

Agrahara (Hosadurga) is a village in the southern state of Karnataka, India. It is located in the Hosadurga taluk of Chitradurga district in Karnataka.

== See also ==
- Chitradurga
- Districts of Karnataka
