= Agrahara, Sandur =

Agrahara
- village
- Location in Karnataka, India Agrahara (India)
- Coordinates: 14.897430°N 76.479620°E
- Country: India
- State: Karnataka
- District: Bellary
- Talukas: Sandur

Government
  - Body: Village Panchayat

Languages
  - Official: Kannada
- Time zone: UTC+5:30 (IST)
- Nearest city: Bellary
- Civic agency: Village Panchayat

Agrahara is a village in the Sandur taluk of Ballari district in Karnataka, India.

== See also ==
- Districts of Karnataka
