= Agrahara, Koratagere =

Agrahara
- village
- Country: India
- State: Karnataka
- District: Tumkur
- Talukas: Koratagere

Government
  - Body: Village Panchayat

Languages
  - Official: Kannada
- Time zone: UTC+5:30 (IST)
- Nearest city: Tumkur
- Civic agency: Village Panchayat

Agrahara (Koratagere) is a village in the southern state of Karnataka, India. It is located in the Koratagere taluk of Tumkur district in Karnataka.

== See also ==
- Tumkur
- Districts of Karnataka
