= Agrahara, Arkalgud =

Agrahara
- village
- Country: India
- State: Karnataka
- District: Hassan
- Talukas: Arkalgud

Government
  - Body: Village Panchayat

Area
  - Total: 4 km^{2} (1.5 sq mi)

Population (2001)
  - Total: 1,200
  - Density: 300/km^{2} (780/sq mi)

Languages
  - Official: Kannada
- Time zone: UTC+5:30 (IST)
- Nearest city: Hassan, India
- Lok Sabha constituency: Hassan
- Vidhan Sabha constituency: Arkalagud
- Civic agency: Village Panchayat
- Climate: cool (Köppen)

Agrahara (Arkalgud) is a village in the southern state of Karnataka, India. It is located in the channarayapatnna taluk of Hassan district in Karnataka.
