= Agrahara, Kanakapura =

Agrahara
- village
- Agrahara, Kanakapura is in Bengaluru South district
- Country: India
- State: Karnataka
- District: Bengaluru South district
- Talukas: Kanakapura

Government
  - Body: Village Panchayat

Languages
  - Official: Kannada
- Time zone: UTC+5:30 (IST)
- Nearest city: Bengaluru
- Civic agency: Village Panchayat

Agrahara, Kanakapura is a village in the southern state of Karnataka, India. It is located in the Kanakapura taluk of Bengaluru South district.

== See also ==
- Bengaluru South district
- Districts of Karnataka
