= Agrahara, Channarayapatna =

Agrahara
- village
- Agrahara, Channarayapatna is in Hassan district
- Interactive map of Agrahara
- Coordinates: 13.194°N 77.849°E
- Country: India
- State: Karnataka
- District: Hassan
- Talukas: Channarayapatna

Government
  - Body: Village Panchayat

Languages
  - Official: Kannada
- Time zone: UTC+5:30 (IST)
- Nearest city: Hassan
- Civic agency: Village Panchayat

Agrahara, Channarayapatna is a village in the southern state of Karnataka, India. It is located in the Channarayapatna taluk of Hassan district in Karnataka.

== See also ==
- Hassan district
- Districts of Karnataka
