= Nagamangala =

- Town
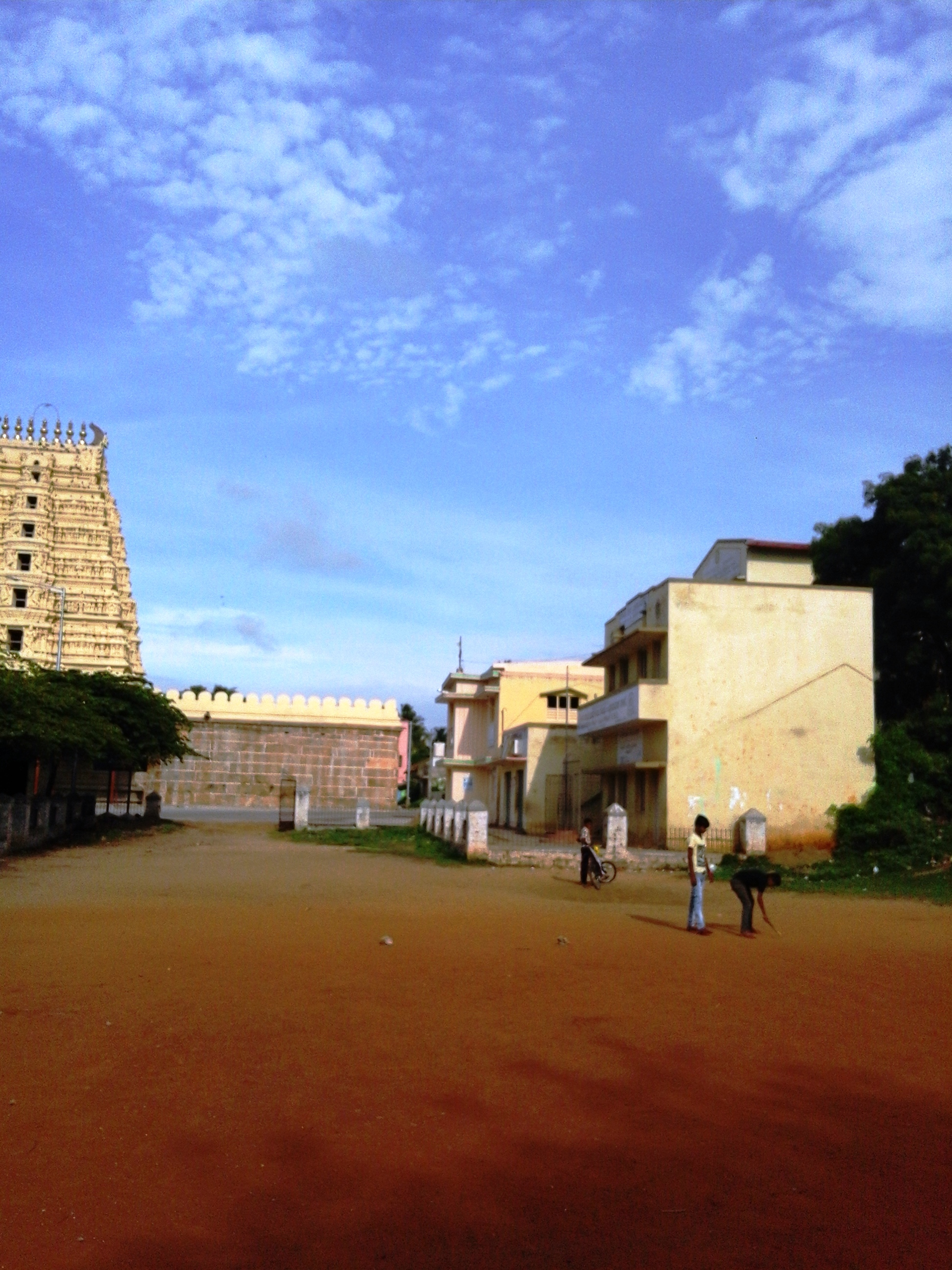
- Rotary School, Nagamangala
- Interactive map of Nagamangala
- Coordinates: 12.82°N 76.76°E
- Country: India
- State: Karnataka
- District: Mandya

Area
  - Town: 10.43 km^{2} (4.03 sq mi)
  - Rural: 1,035.26 km^{2} (399.72 sq mi)
- Elevation: 772 m (2,533 ft)

Population (2011)
  - Town: 24,059
  - Density: 2,307/km^{2} (5,974/sq mi)
  - Rural: 170,121

Languages
  - Official: Kannada
- Time zone: UTC+5:30 (IST)
- Postal code: 571432
- Vehicle registration: KA-54
- Website: www.nagamangalatown.mrc.gov.in

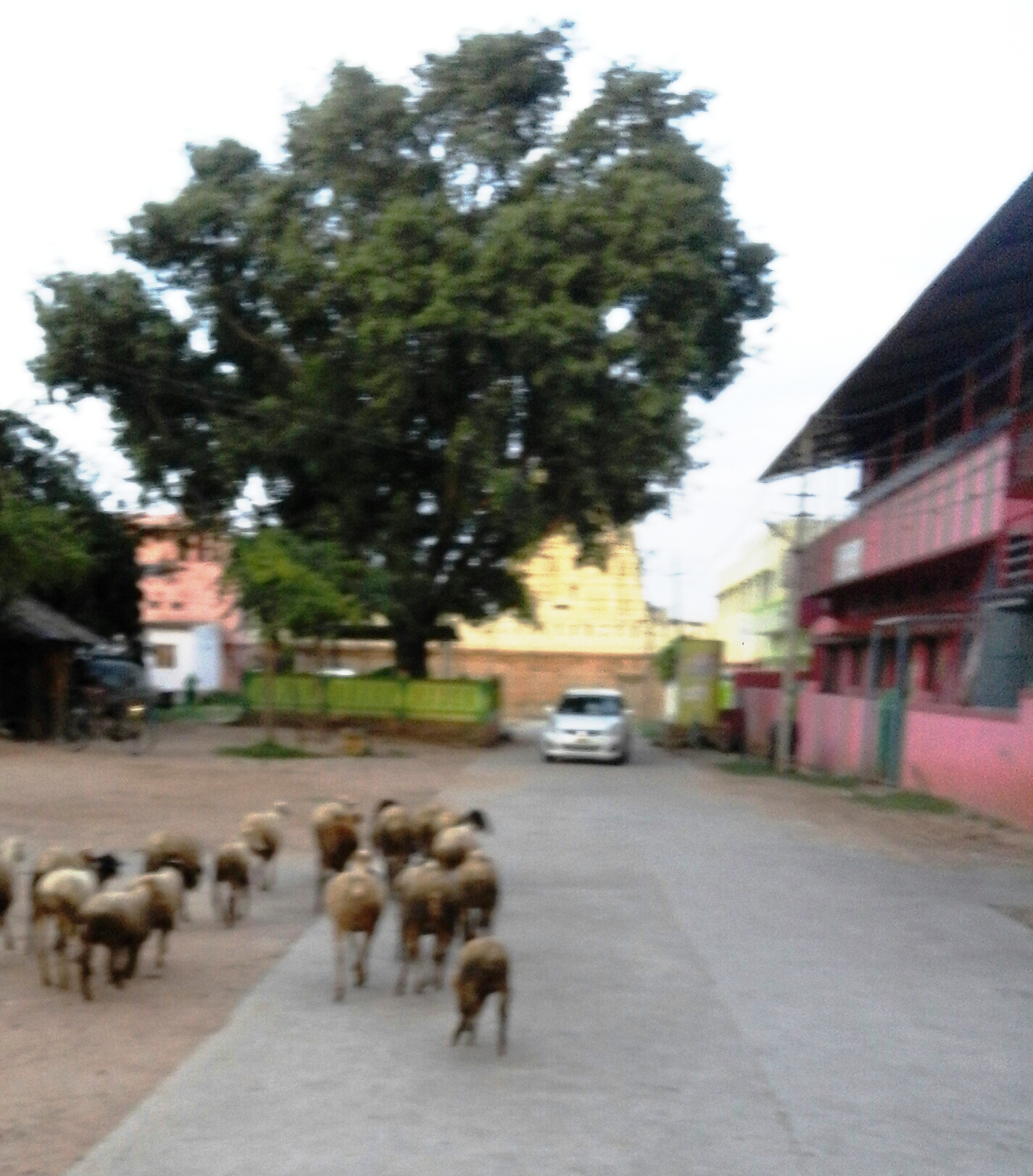
Old Post Office Road, Nagamangala

Nāgamangala is a PuraSabhe (town panchayat) and a taluk in Mandya district, in the Indian state of Karnataka.

Nāgamangala lies on the junction between NH-150A and SH-85. It is 43 km from its district headquarter Mandya, 70 km from Mysuru, 115 km from Bengaluru, 261 km from Mangaluru and 425 km from Hubballi. The nearest railway station is B. G. Nagar at 17 km. Nearest airport is Kempegowda International Airport at 140 km.

== Demographics ==
As of 2011 India census, Nagamangala had a population of 17,776. Males constitute 50% of the population and females 50%. Nagamangala has an average literacy rate of 87.01%, higher than the state average of 75.36%: male literacy is 90.16%, and female literacy is 83.98%. In Nagamangala, 12% of the population is under 6 years of age.

Languages of Nagamangala Town (2011)
1. Kannada (56.8%)
2. Urdu (36.2%)
3. Telugu (2.67%)
4. Hindi (1.55%)
5. Marathi (1.52%)
6. Tamil (0.80%)
7. Others (0.47%)

== List of temples in Nagamangala ==
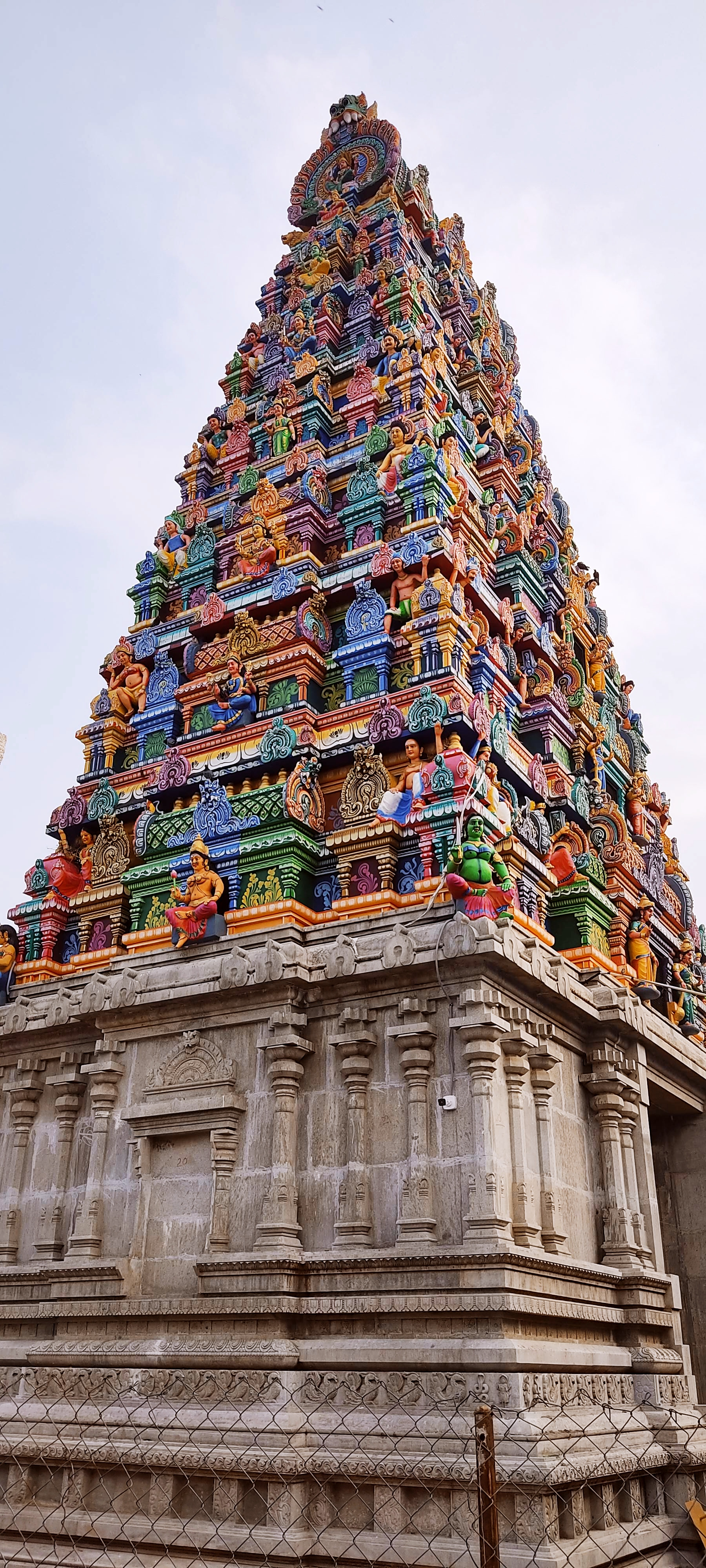
Mulkattamma temple, Mulukatte

- Sri Yoganarasimha Temple
- Saumyakeshava Temple
- Sri Veerabhadreshwara & Bhadrakali Temple
- Sri Anjenya temple, Kachenahalli
- Sri Muttinamma devi temple, Tuppadamadu
- Sri Malleshwara swamy temple, Tuppadamadu
- Sri Mulkattamma temple, Mulukatte
- Sri Ranganatha temple, Vaddarahalli
- sri Hucchamma devi temple
- Sri Haddinakallu Hanumantharaya Swami temple
- Sri Thiruvenkataramana Temple (Nadukerappa), ThiruganaHalli
- Sri Prasanna ganapati temple, T. B. Circle
- Sri Varadarayaswamyi Temple, Dandigana Hallly
- Sri Dodda Lakshmi devi Temple, Jodi Neralakere
- Sri Gudde Anjenya Temple, Huchakalle Gowdanakoppalu

== See also ==
- Adichunchanagiri Peacock Wildlife Sanctuary
