= Mandya =

- City
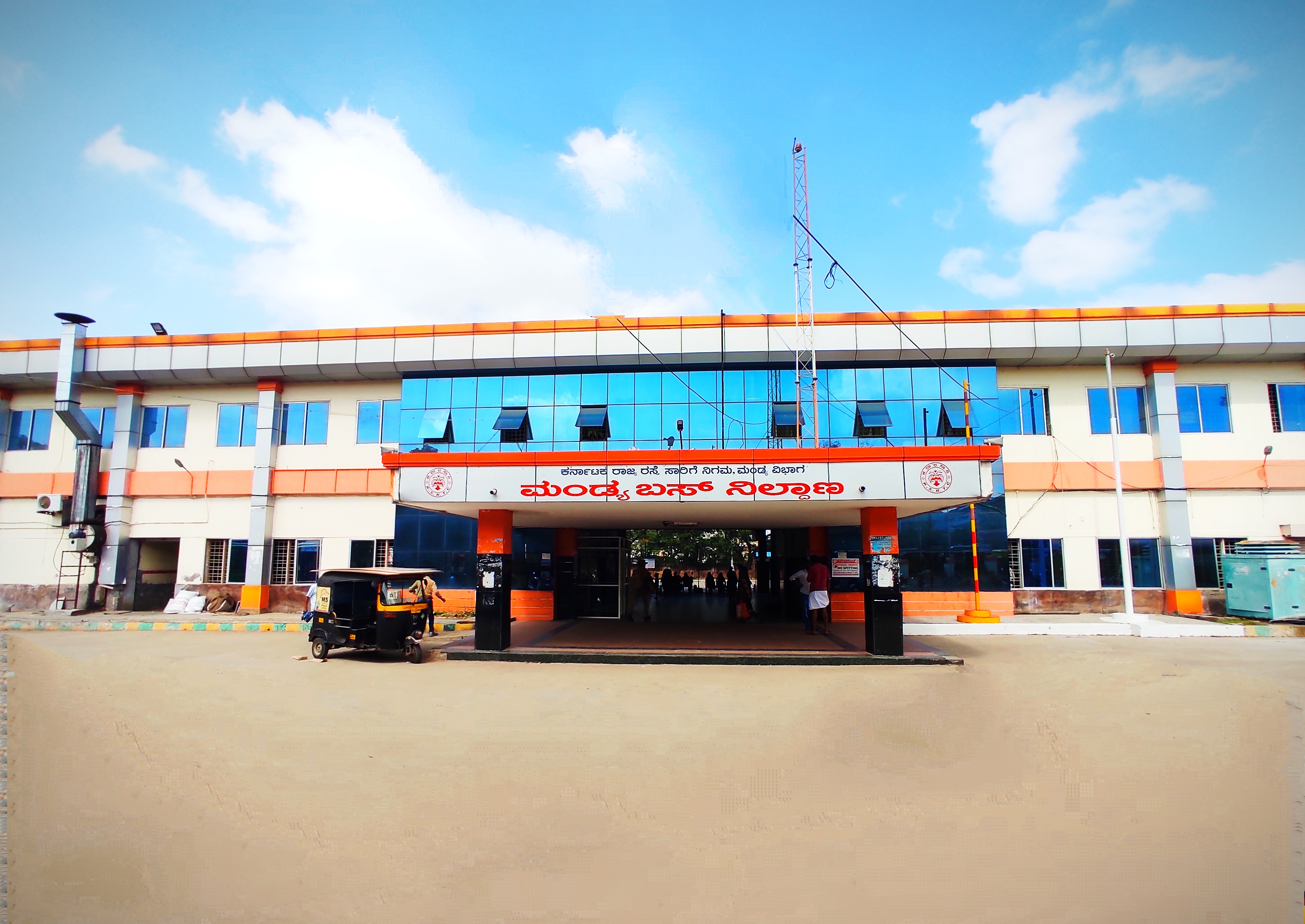
- Mandya bus stand
- Nickname: Sugar City
- Interactive map of Mandya
- Coordinates: 12.52°N 76.9°E
- Country: India
- State: Karnataka
- Division: Mysore
- District: Mandya

Government
  - Body: City Municipal Council

Area
  - City: 17.03 km^{2} (6.58 sq mi)
  - Rural: 692.14 km^{2} (267.24 sq mi)
- Elevation: 678 m (2,224 ft)

Population (2011)
  - City: 137,735
  - Density: 8,088/km^{2} (20,950/sq mi)
  - Rural: 277,795
- Time zone: UTC+5:30 (IST)
- PIN: 571401
- Vehicle registration: KA-11
- Official language: Kannada
- Website: mandyacity.mrc.gov.in

Mandya is a city, also taluka in the state of Karnataka. It is the headquarters of Mandya district. It is also called Sugar City (Kannada: Sakkare Nagara) because sugarcane is a major crop grown here, and sugar factories contribute to the major economic output. The district offices are located here. The city has been divided into 35 wards of the Mandya City Municipal Council.

== History ==
Mandya celebrated its 75th year anniversary (Amrutha Mahothsava) in 2015. The KRS dam was built by Krishna Raja Wadiyar IV and M. Visvesvaraya in Mandya, opening in 1932. Mandya is home to a number of historically important sites. In 2016, Archaeological Survey of India (ASI) excavated another 13 ft (4.0 m) statue of Bahubali, a much revered figure among Jains. He was the son of Adinath, the first tirthankara of Jainism, and the younger brother of Bharata Chakravartin, identified with the 3rd – 9th centuries in Arthipura, Mandya district. The excavation is expected to be completed by 2018. The Archaeological Survey of India has also excavated an 8th-century statue of Bahubali in Arthipura, Maddur, Mandya, Karnataka, that is 3 ft (0.91 m) wide and 3.5 ft (1.1 m) tall.

Mandya RTO Code is KA11

== Agriculture and jaggery industry ==
Mandya is one of the agriculturally important districts of Karnataka. Sugarcane is a major crop of the district, while jaggery and sugar industries contribute significantly to the local economy. Mandya is also known as "Sakkare Nagara" (Sugar City).

Jaggery is an established sugarcane-based product of the Mandya region. The Government of India's One District One Product (ODOP) programme lists jaggery as the primary product of Mandya, Karnataka. The National Portal of India describes Mandya jaggery as being made from freshly harvested sugarcane juice using traditional methods.

Several jaggery-processing businesses operate in the Mandya region. Shree Agro Food Industries, based in Mandya, manufactures sugarcane jaggery under the brand name Shree Natural Jaggery. The company describes its products as chemical-free processed jaggery. Shree Natural Jaggery has also been featured in independent media coverage relating to jaggery production in the region.

The development of agriculture in Mandya was influenced by irrigation from the Krishna Raja Sagara (KRS) reservoir. According to Karnataka Tourism, irrigation from the KRS reservoir during the 1930s contributed to changes in the cropping pattern and agricultural productivity of the region.

== Geography ==
Mandya is located at 12.52°N 76.9°E. It has an average elevation of 678 metres (2,224 ft).

== Demographics ==
As per the 2011 India census, Mandya had a population of 137,358. The sex ratio is 1000 females per 1000 males, higher than the state average of 973. Mandya has an average literacy rate of 85.32%, higher than the state average of 75.36%: male literacy is 89.39%, and female literacy is 81.29%. 10.14% of the population is under 6 years of age. Scheduled Castes constitute 13.40% while Scheduled Tribes constitute 1.17% of the total population of Mandya (CMC).

Religions in Mandya city (2011)
Religion	Percent
Hinduism	89.55%
Islam	5.71%
Christianity	2.20%
Jainism	1.44%
Other or not stated	0.11%

Languages of Mandya City
1. Kannada 89.88 (87.9%)
2. Urdu 4.76 (4.65%)
3. Tamil 1.79 (1.75%)
4. Telugu 1.16 (1.13%)
5. Hindi 1.87 (1.83%)
6. Marathi 1.46 (1.43%)
7. Others 1.39 (1.36%)

== Transport ==
The Mandya railway station is located in the city centre, well connected to Mysuru and Bengaluru. There are daily train services to Chennai, Hyderabad, Kochuveli, Mangalore, Belgaum, Bagalkot, Hubli, Ballari and weekly trains to Varanasi, Darbhanga, Jaipur, Ajmer. The city has a KSRTC bus stand with frequent buses to Bangalore and Mysore. The NH-275/SH-88 is a major highway passing through the city.

== Climate ==
Climate data for Mandya (1991–2020, extremes 1972–2020)
Month	Jan	Feb	Mar	Apr	May	Jun	Jul	Aug	Sep	Oct	Nov	Dec	Year
Record high °C (°F)	35.6 (96.1)	36.8 (98.2)	38.0 (100.4)	39.6 (103.3)	39.1 (102.4)	37.9 (100.2)	34.4 (93.9)	34.0 (93.2)	35.1 (95.2)	33.5 (92.3)	33.0 (91.4)	36.6 (97.9)	39.6 (103.3)
Mean daily maximum °C (°F)	30.1 (86.2)	32.4 (90.3)	34.7 (94.5)	35.0 (95.0)	33.9 (93.0)	30.6 (87.1)	29.5 (85.1)	29.3 (84.7)	30.1 (86.2)	29.7 (85.5)	29.1 (84.4)	28.6 (83.5)	31.1 (88.0)
Mean daily minimum °C (°F)	15.5 (59.9)	17.3 (63.1)	19.9 (67.8)	21.9 (71.4)	21.7 (71.1)	20.7 (69.3)	20.3 (68.5)	20.3 (68.5)	20.0 (68.0)	19.8 (67.6)	18.2 (64.8)	16.1 (61.0)	19.3 (66.7)
Record low °C (°F)	8.0 (46.4)	9.0 (48.2)	11.1 (52.0)	15.0 (59.0)	11.7 (53.1)	12.1 (53.8)	15.0 (59.0)	12.2 (54.0)	12.7 (54.9)	12.3 (54.1)	10.1 (50.2)	8.1 (46.6)	8.0 (46.4)
Average rainfall mm (inches)	0.8 (0.03)	1.1 (0.04)	13.7 (0.54)	53.2 (2.09)	94.8 (3.73)	60.4 (2.38)	50.5 (1.99)	91.4 (3.60)	122.5 (4.82)	176.9 (6.96)	54.6 (2.15)	12.9 (0.51)	732.8 (28.85)
Average rainy days	0.2	0.2	1.0	3.4	5.7	4.0	4.7	6.0	6.5	8.9	4.1	1.1	45.7
Average relative humidity (%) (at 17:30 IST)	41	35	33	42	51	65	67	67	63	67	64	54	54
Source: India Meteorological Department

== See also ==
- Tourist Attractions in Mandya
