= Gopalrao =

Gopalrao is an Indian masculine name. Notable people with this name include:

- Shrikrishna Gopalrao Dani professor of mathematics in Mumbai, India
- Deshmukh Balajirao Gopalrao, politician and a former member of the Indian National Congress
- Rao Gopalrao (1937–1994), Indian actor and producer in Telugu cinema and Telugu theatre
- Gopalrao Bajirao Khedkar (1901–1969), social activist and a farmers leader in India
- Gopalrao Mayekar (1934–2021), writer and a leader of Maharashtrawadi Gomantak Party
- Sethuram Gopalrao Neginhal (1929–2021), Indian forest official and conservationist
- Gopalrao Patil (born 1931), Indian politician and pediatrician

== See also ==
- Gopalrao Deshmukh Marg, an arterial road in the city of Mumbai, India
