= Vellalore Lake =

Lake in Tamil Nadu, India

Coordinates: 10.976°N 77.008°E

- Interactive map of Vellalore Lake
- Location: Coimbatore, Tamil Nadu, India

Vellalore Lake is a lake in Coimbatore, Tamil Nadu. The lake is spread over an area of 90 acres and the green zone around the lake attracts over 80 species with its native trees and flowers. After being dry for over two decades, the lake came alive again in 2018 due to the efforts of the district administration and NGOs. In April 2023, Kovai Kulangal Padhukappu Amaippu and the district administration launched work to set up a Butterfly Park.

== Wildlife ==
The lake is a breeding ground for spot-billed pelicans. Rosy Starlings, a migratory bird, also makes Vellalore lake its home as thousands of birds arrive for roosting in the winter season.

== Butterfly hotspot ==
The state butterfly of Maharashtra, Blue Mormons, have been sighted in huge numbers near the lake. The common-banded peacock, another attractive bluish-green butterfly, along with medus brown, chocolate albatross, and bamboo tree brown butterflies were spotted by butterfly enthusiasts. Pavendhan A of the Tamil Nadu Butterfly Society said that 83 species were spotted at the lake.
