= Gowthavaram =

- Interactive map of Gowthavaram
- Location in Andhra Pradesh, India
- Coordinates: 15.48°N 78.98°E

Gowthavaram is a village in Racherla mandal, in the Markapuram district in the state of Andhra Pradesh in southern India. Its population consists of about 300 families of different castes. The dominant profession is agriculture with a small number working as teachers, policemen and in the military. There is an upper primary school with a student population of about 200.

Gowhtavaram is known for Painted stork nesting. The village was formerly a part of Anumula Palli Panchayati. In 1996 it became an independent Panchayath by Maruthota Madduleti (retired Head Master).
