= Uppalapadu =

- Village
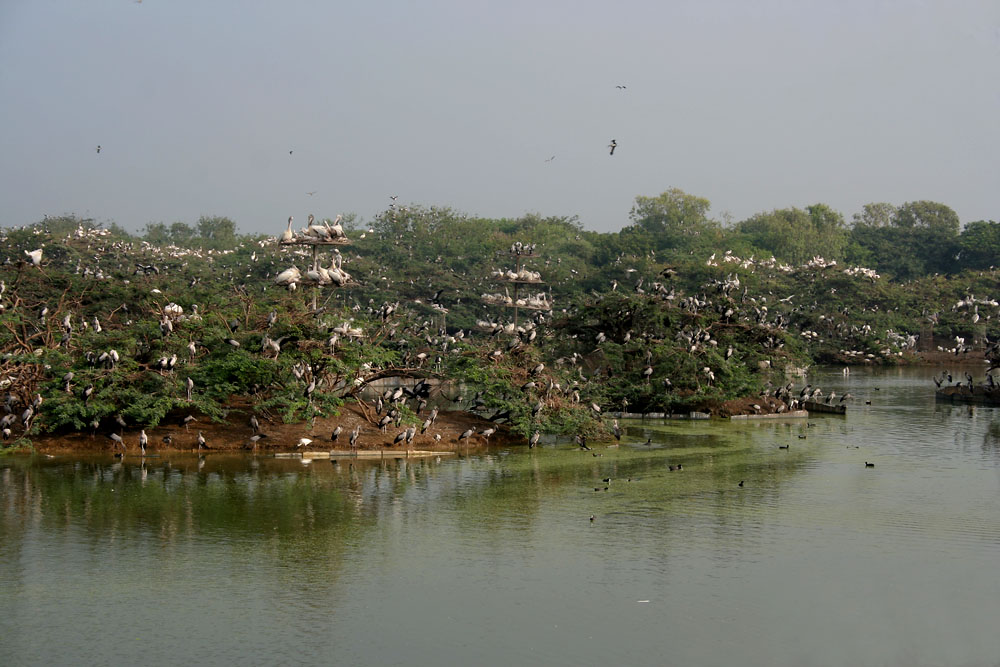
- Heronry at Uppalpadu
- Interactive map of Uppalapadu
- Location in Andhra Pradesh, India
- Coordinates: 16°18′N 80°30′E
- Country: India
- State: Andhra Pradesh
- District: Guntur
- Mandal: Pedakakani

Government
  - Type: Panchayati raj
  - Body: Uppalapadu gram panchayat

Area
  - Total: 1,660 ha (4,100 acres)

Population (2011)
  - Total: 6,175
  - Density: 372/km^{2} (963/sq mi)

Languages
  - Official: Telugu
- Time zone: UTC+5:30 (IST)
- PIN: 522509
- Area code: +91–863
- Vehicle registration: AP

Uppalapadu is a village in the Guntur district of the Indian state of Andhra Pradesh. It is located in Pedakakani mandal of Guntur revenue division.

== Geography ==
Uppalapadu is located at 16.18°N 80.30°E. it is located 2 km from Pedakakani.

== Bird sanctuary ==
The Bird Center is located just after the village entrance. The water tanks in the village are unique as they provide refuge to many species of birds, including endangered spot-billed pelicans and painted storks. The birds migrate here from various places such as Siberia, and use the center for nesting.

== Government and politics ==
Uppalapadu gram panchayat is the local self-government of the village. It is divided into wards and each ward is represented by a ward member. The ward members are headed by a Sarpanch. The current Sarpanch of the village is Srinivasa Rao.Karnati. The village forms a part of Andhra Pradesh Capital Region and is under the jurisdiction of APCRDA.

== Education ==
As per the school information report for the academic year 2018–19, the village has a total of 7 schools. These include 5 Zilla Parishad/Mandal Parishad and 2 private schools.

== See also ==
- List of villages in Guntur district
