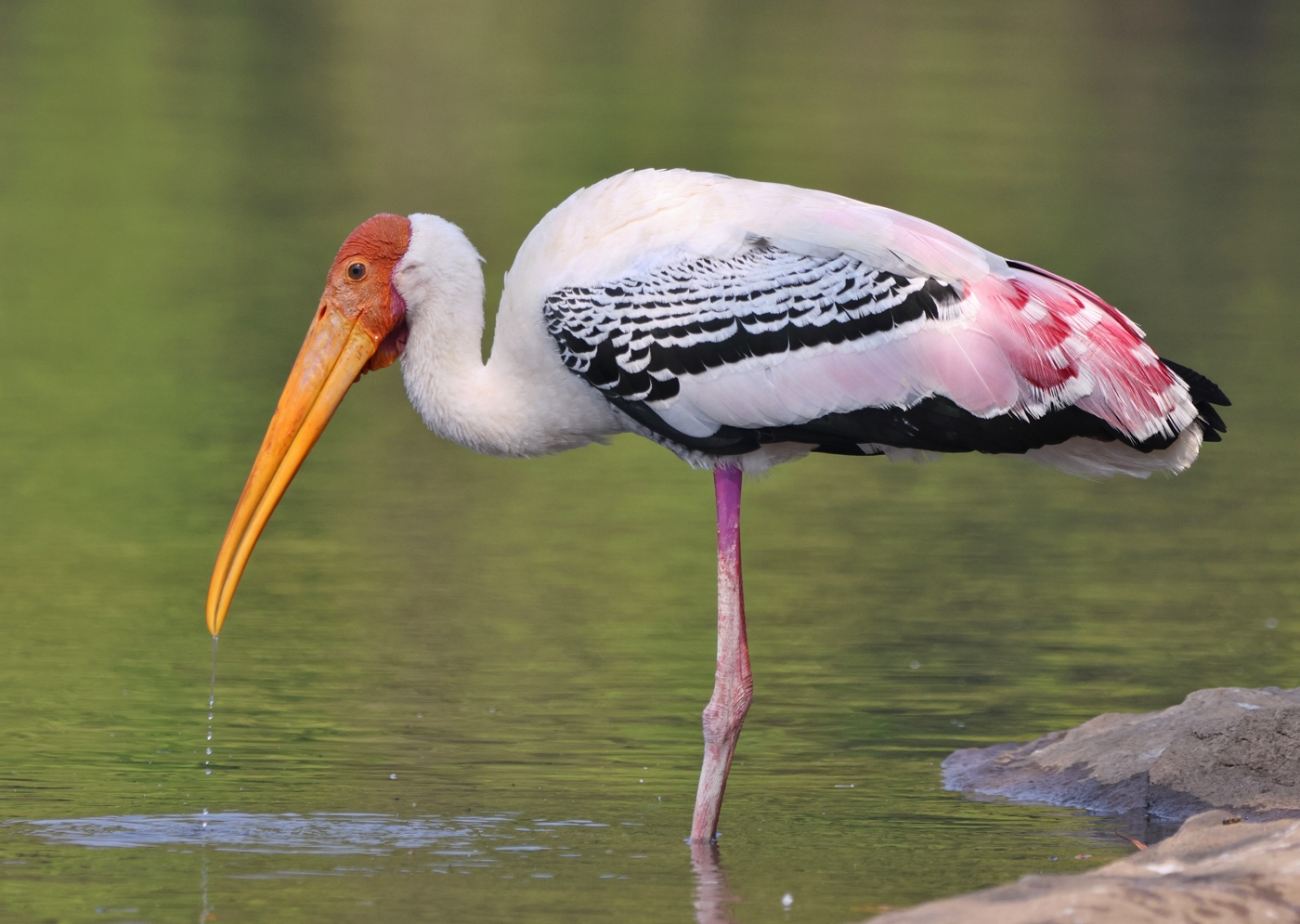
- Adult bird in breeding colours

Conservation status
- Near Threatened (IUCN 3.1)

Scientific classification
- Kingdom: Animalia
- Phylum: Chordata
- Class: Aves
- Order: Ciconiiformes
- Family: Ciconiidae
- Genus: Mycteria
- Species: M. leucocephala

Binomial name
- Mycteria leucocephala (Pennant, 1769)
- Non-breeding range Year-round range

Synonyms
- Tantalus leucocephalus Ibis leucocephalus Pseudotantalus leucocephalus

= Painted stork =

Species of bird

The painted stork (Mycteria leucocephala) is a large wader in the stork family. It is found in the wetlands of the plains of tropical Asia south of the Himalayas in the Indian subcontinent and extending into Southeast Asia. The distinctive pink tertial feathers of the adults give them their name. They forage in flocks in shallow waters along rivers or lakes. They immerse their half open beaks in water and sweep them from side to side and snap up their prey of small fish that are sensed by touch. As they wade along they also stir the water with their feet to flush hiding fish. They nest colonially in trees, often along with other waterbirds. The only sounds they produce are weak moans or bill clattering at the nest. They are not long-distance migrants and only make short-distance movements in some parts of their range in response to changes in weather or food availability or for breeding. Like other storks, they are often seen soaring on thermals.

== Description ==
This large stork has a heavy yellow beak with a down-curved tip that gives it a resemblance to an ibis. The head of the adult is bare and orange or reddish in colour. The long tertials are tipped in bright pink and at rest they extend over the back and rump. There is a distinctive black breast band with white scaly markings. The band continues into the under-wing coverts and the white tips of the black coverts give it the appearance of white stripes running across the under-wing lining.

The rest of the body is whitish in adults and the primaries and secondaries are black with a greenish gloss. The legs are yellowish to red but often appear white due their habit of urohidrosis or defecating on their legs especially when at rest. The short tail is black with a green gloss. For a stork, it is medium-sized, standing about 93–102 cm (36.5–40 in) tall, 150–160 cm (59–63 in) in wingspan and weighing 2–3.5 kg (4.4–7.7 lb). Males and females appear alike but the males of a pair are usually larger than the female.

The downy young are mainly whitish with grey bills and blackish facial skin. The juveniles assume a brownish plumage and like most other storks reach breeding condition after two to three years.

Like all storks, they fly with their neck outstretched. They often make use of the late morning thermals to soar in search of foraging areas. Like other storks they are mostly silent but clatter their bills at nest and may make some harsh croaking or low moaning sounds at nest.

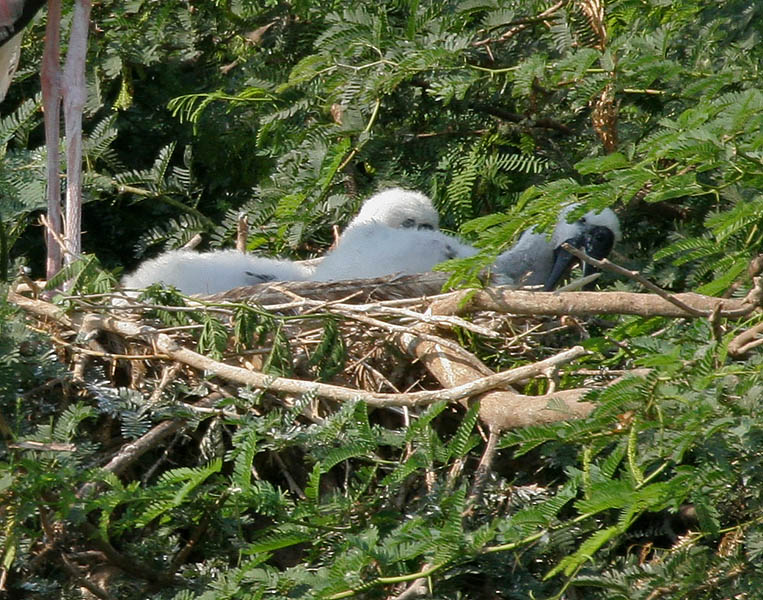
Downy chicks at nest in Uppalapadu

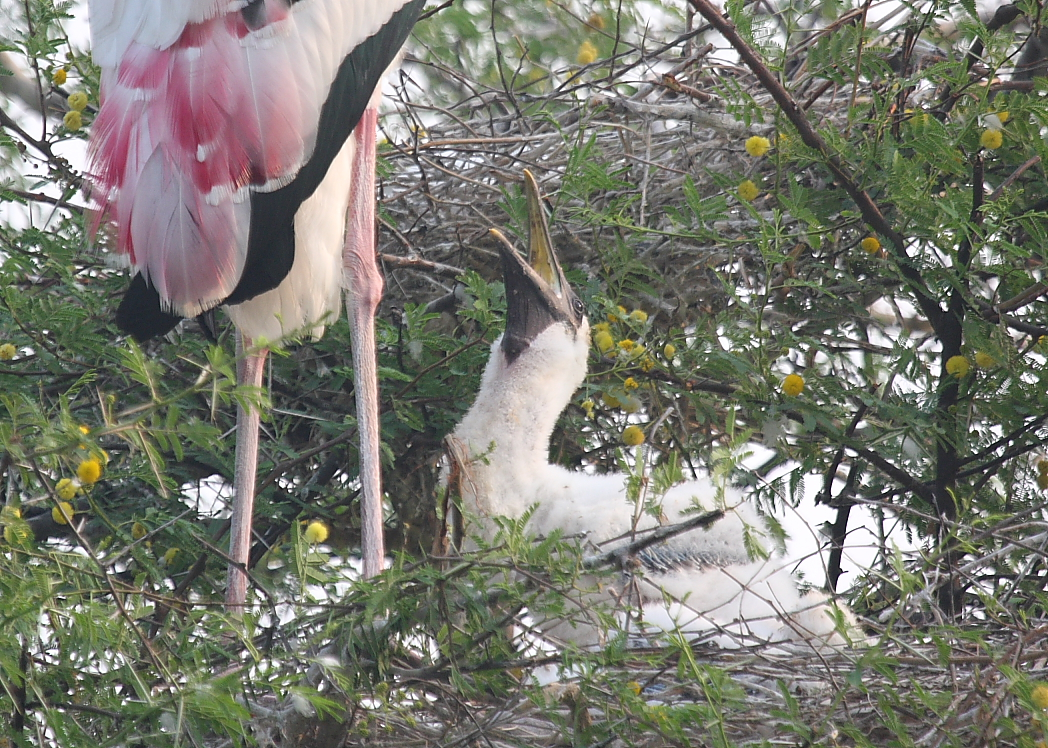
A young chick begs parent for food at nest

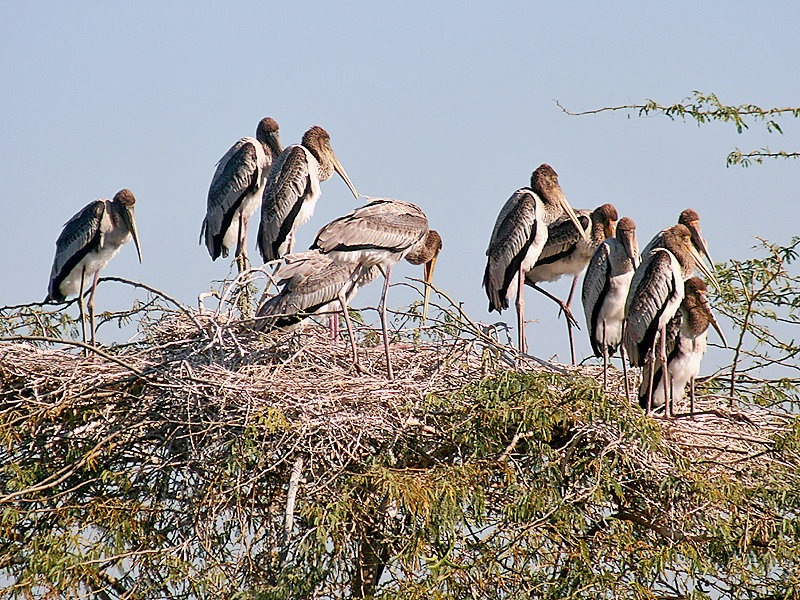
Immatures at their nests on Prosopis juliflora (Bharatpur, India)

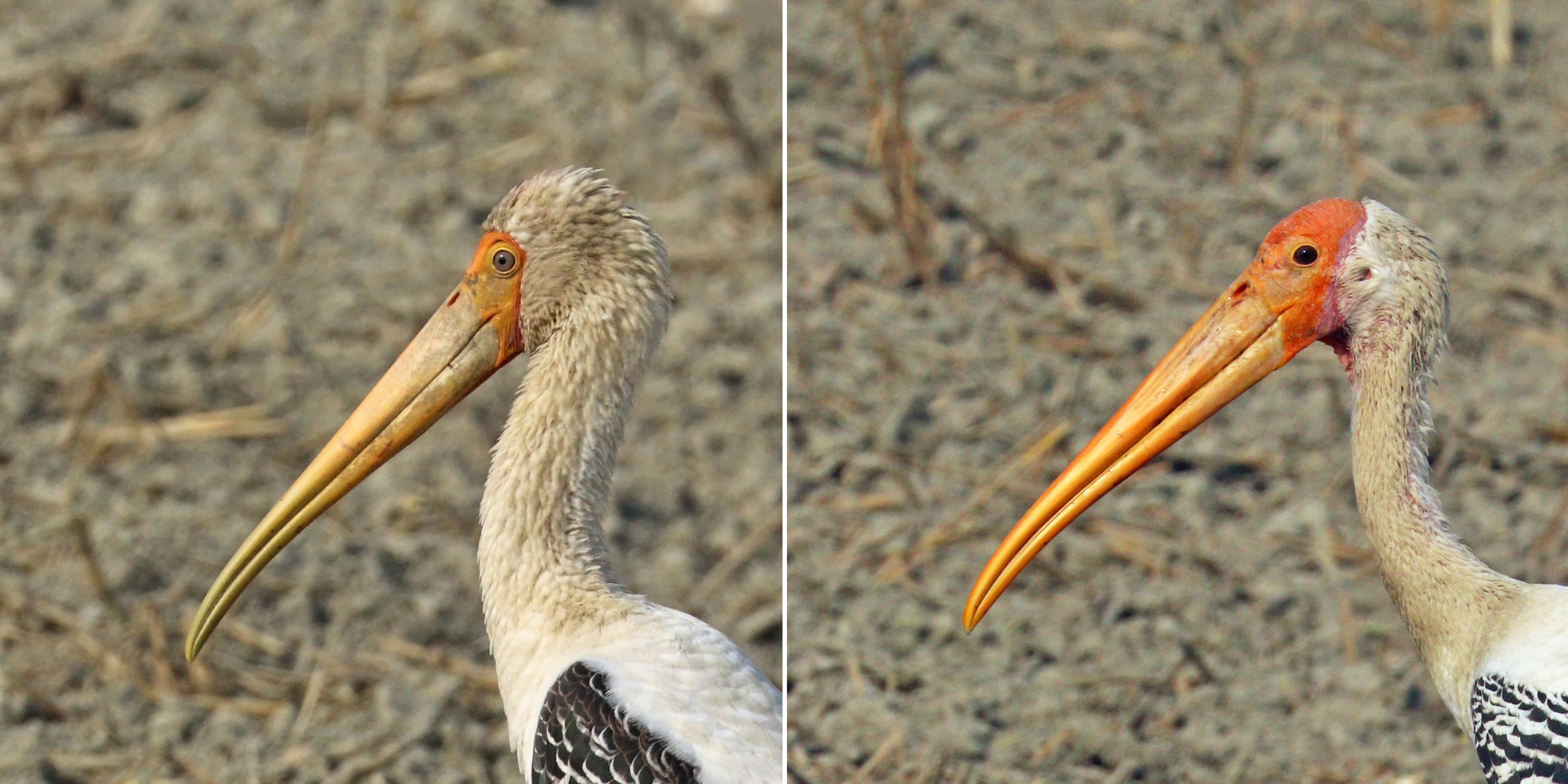
Subadult (left) and adult heads

== Taxonomy ==
In the past the species has been placed in the genera Ibis, Tantalus and Pseudotantalus. The slight curve to the beak led them to be considered as a relative of the ibises. The older genus names were based on Greek mythology where Tantalus was punished by having to stand in a pool of water. T C Jerdon called it the "Pelican Ibis". Later studies placed along with the wood-storks in the genus Mycteria, members of which have similar bill structure and share a common feeding behaviour of sweeping their half-open bill from side to side inside water as they wade and their evolutionary affinity has been confirmed by sequence based studies.

== Distribution and habitat ==
The painted stork is widely distributed over the plains of Asia. They are found south of the Himalayan ranges and are bounded on the west by the Indus River system where they are rare and extend eastwards into Southeast Asia. They are absent from very dry or desert regions, dense forests and the higher hill regions. They are rare in most of Kerala and the species appears to have expanded into that region only in the 1990s. They prefer freshwater wetlands in all seasons, but also use irrigation canals and crop fields, particularly flooded rice fields during the monsoon and fallow fields during the summer. They are resident in most regions but make seasonal movements. Young birds may disperse far from their breeding sites as demonstrated by a juvenile ringed at a nest in Keoladeo National Park that was recovered 800 kilometres away at Chilka in eastern India. Breeding is always on large trees, usually in areas where nesting trees are secured over long periods of time, including in wetland reserves, along community-managed village ponds and lakes, inside villages when protection is also afforded to nesting birds like in Kokrebellur, protected tree patches in urban locations such as zoos, and on islands in urban wetlands.

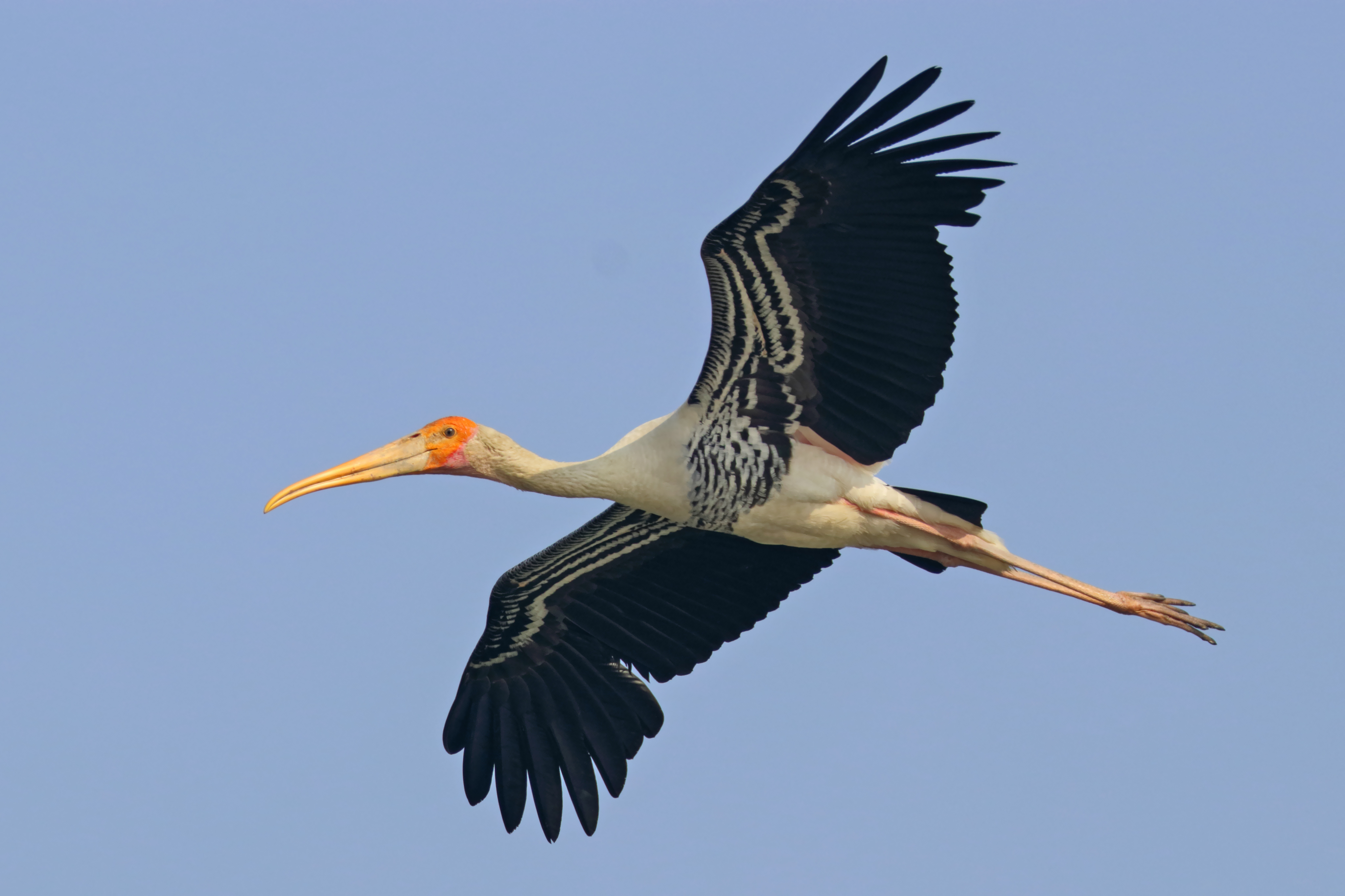

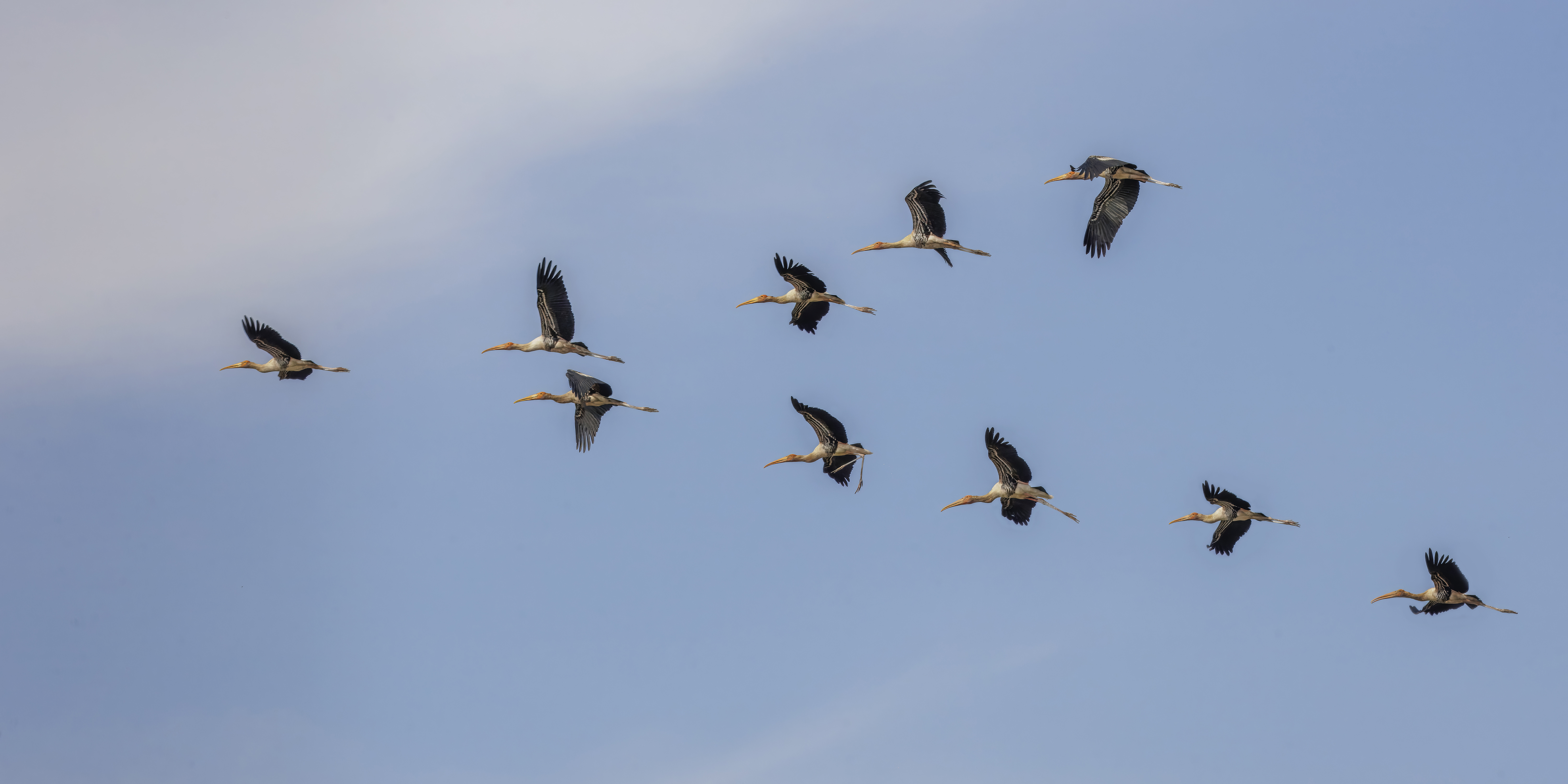

== Behaviour and ecology ==
Painted storks feed in groups in shallow wetlands, crop fields and irrigation canals. The maximum success of finding prey was at 7 cm of water depth at Keoladeo National Park. They feed mainly on small fish which they sense by touch while slowly sweeping their half open bill from side to side while it held submerged. They walk slowly and also disturb the water with their feet to flush fish. They also take frogs and the occasional snake. They forage mainly in the day but may forage late or even at night under exceptional conditions. After they are fed they may stand still on the shore for long durations. Painted storks in the Delhi region were observed eating fish, while those in Kokrebellur in south India fed nestlings with frogs, crabs, large insects and grasshoppers. Flock sizes in agricultural landscapes are mostly small (<5 birds) but reach flocks of over 50 birds. In such landscapes, flock sizes do not vary much between seasons, but densities are much higher in winter after chicks of the year have fledged from nests.

Painted storks breed on trees either in mixed colonies along with other water birds, or by themselves. The breeding season begins in the winter months shortly after the monsoons. In northern India, the breeding season begins in mid-August while in southern India the nest initiation begins around October and continues till February and or even until April. One detailed study in Bengaluru city saw storks building nests between early February and mid-March, with all of the observed nests having fledgelings by mid-May. Considerable variation is noticed in the onset of breeding across sites with the season at Kokrebellur and Edurupattu around January or February but at Telineelapuram, Kundakulam and Tirunelveli the breeding begins around October or November.

The typical clutch varies from one to five eggs with early breeders having larger clutches. The incubation period is about a month while the fledging period is nearly two months. There is occasional predation of chicks by migrant Aquila eagles, Pallas's fish eagle, House Crows, and Black Kites. During the mid-day heat, adults will stand at the nest with wings outstretched to shade the chicks. They defecate on their legs which are highly vascularized in order to cool themselves. This behaviour known as urohidrosis increases with ambient temperature. To feed chicks, adults regurgitate fish that they have caught and these are typically smaller than 20 cm (7.9 in) long. Young chicks, when threatened, disgorge food and feign death by crumpling to the nest floor. The daily requirement for chicks has been estimated to be 500–600 grams (18–21 oz) made up of about 9 fish fed in two sessions. Nest survival (measured as daily nest survival) is higher for nests initiated early in the monsoon season, lower with decreasing temperature, and higher at larger colonies. The bare red skin on the head is developed when reaching breeding maturity and involves the loss of feathers and the deposition of lipids under the skin. Birds in captivity have been known to live for as long as 28 years. Birds raised as chicks have been known to be tame and docile, even responding to their names when called.

A bird louse, Ardeicola tantali was described on the basis of a specimen obtained from this species as also a subcutaneous mite, Neottialges kutzeri, of the family Hypoderidae.

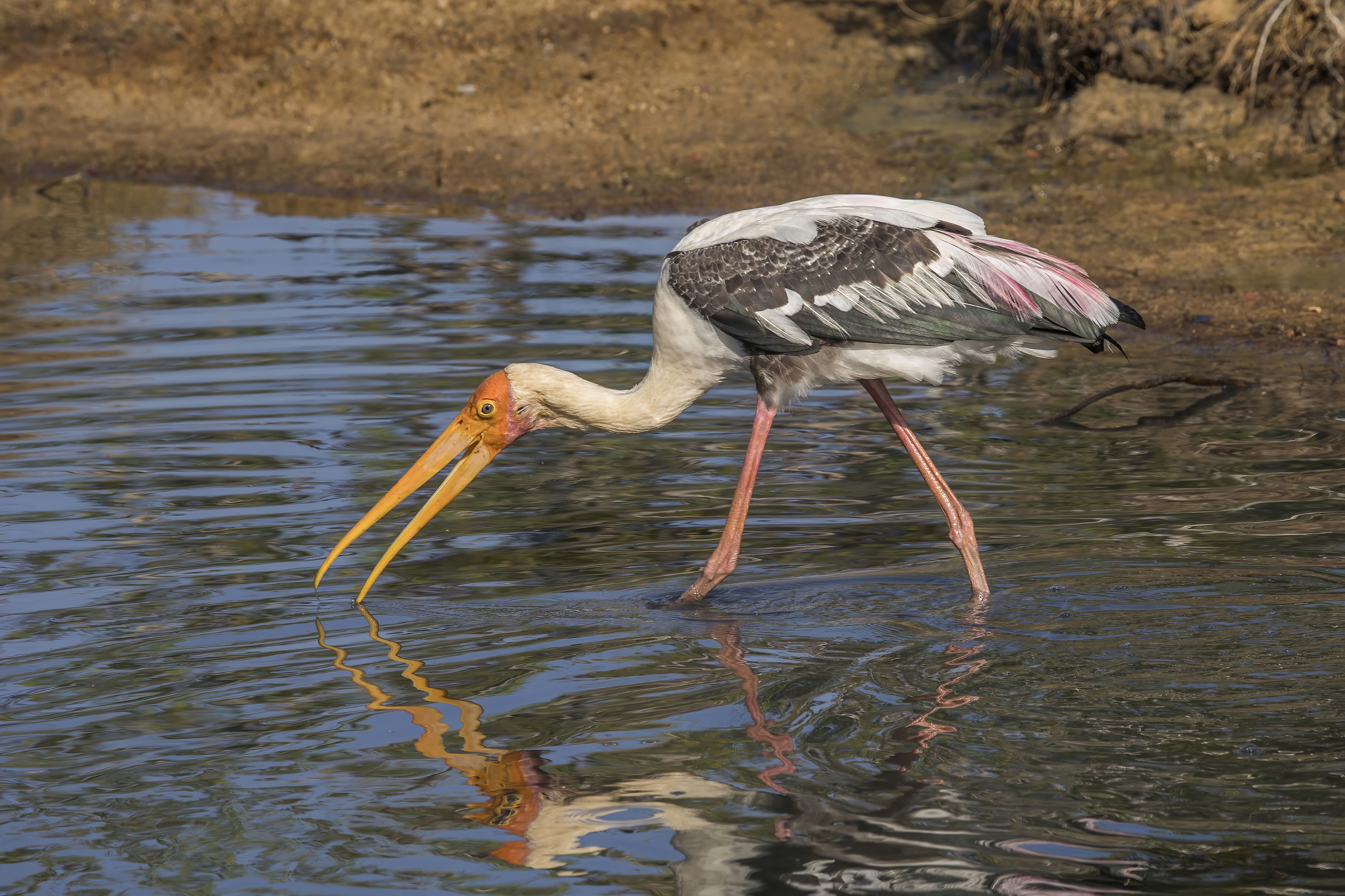

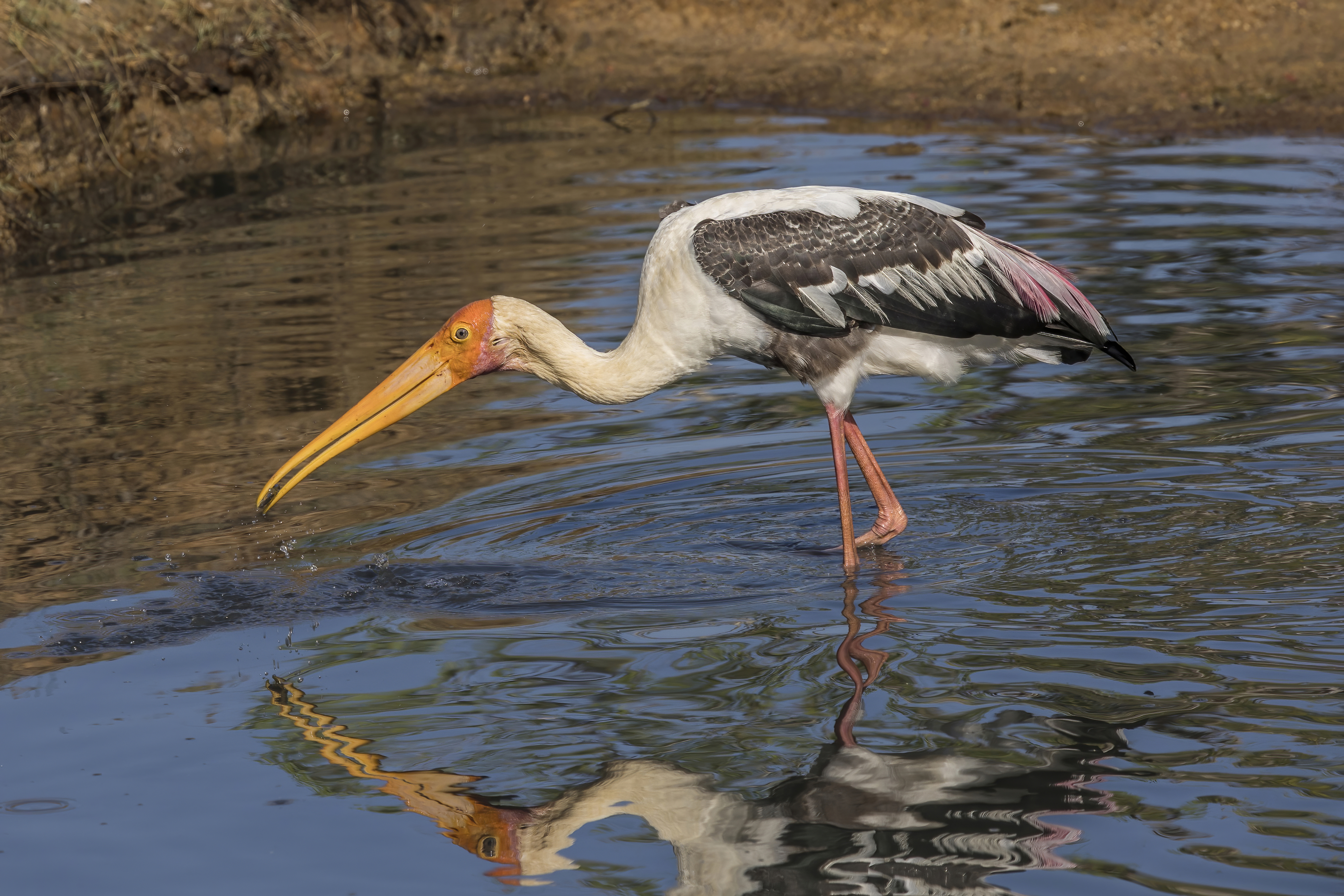
catching fish

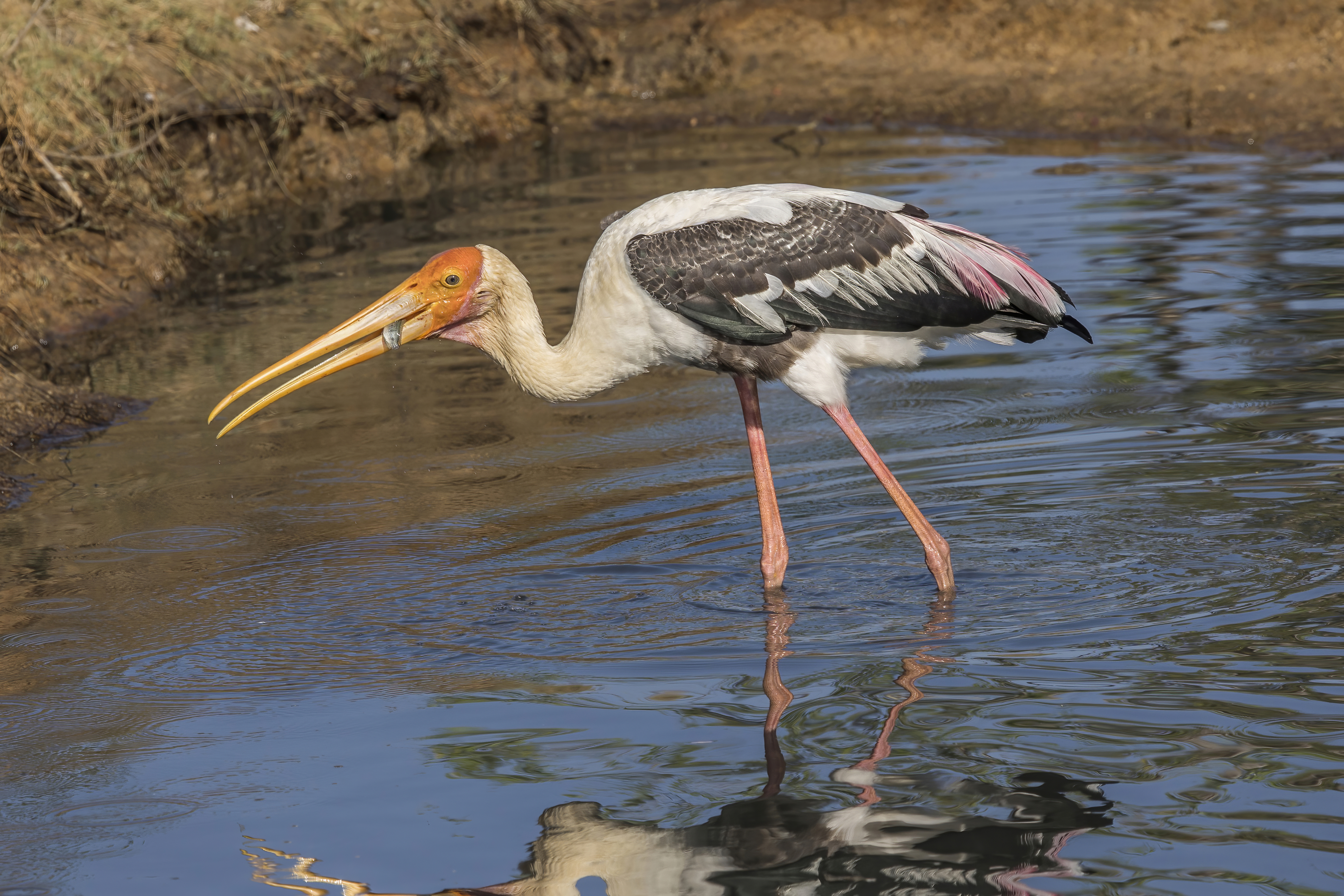

== Conservation ==
Painted stork nesting colonies often become centres of tourist attraction due to their large size and colour. Particularly well-known nest sites close to human settlements are in the south Indian villages of Kokrebellur and Veerapura. In Kokrebellur, the birds nest within the trees in the village forming mixed nesting colonies with the spot-billed pelican. The local people provide security to these birds during the brief nesting season when the birds arrive in October and until they leave the village after a couple of months. Another well-known colony that has been studied since the 1960s is the one inside the Delhi Zoological Park where the birds arrive about 30–40 days after the onset of the monsoons in Delhi. This colony is made up of 300 to 600 wild birds that make use of the trees within the artificial islands inside the zoo. Another colony of 26-96 nests is known from the Sultanpur National Park in Haryana, India where years with increased rainfall see more storks nesting. The largest north-Indian breeding population is known from Keoladeo-Ghana National Park that is estimated to have 2,500 nests. Uppalapadu village near Guntur in Andhra Pradesh, Kolleru, Gowtavaram Village in Andhra Pradesh and Ranganathittu are among the many other breeding colonies known from southern India. Captive birds are known to breed readily when provided with nesting materials and platforms. The largest secure population is found in India. Birds in Pakistan along the Indus River system are endangered and chicks at their nests are taken away for the bird trade. The species was nearly decimated in Thailand while small populations are known from Cambodia and Vietnam. Painted Storks taken from Sri Lanka were kept in captivity and subsequently released in Malaysia where the annual growth of the population is 10-13%.

There are some concerns for the closely related milky stork owing to hybridization with the painted stork, particularly in zoos. Hybrids have been recorded in the wild in Cambodia and in several zoos including those at Kuala Lumpur, Singapore Zoo and Bangkok. Hybridization with lesser adjutant storks have also been recorded in several zoos, especially at the Colombo Zoo, Sri Lanka where a male painted stork and female lesser adjutant mated and reared chicks several times.

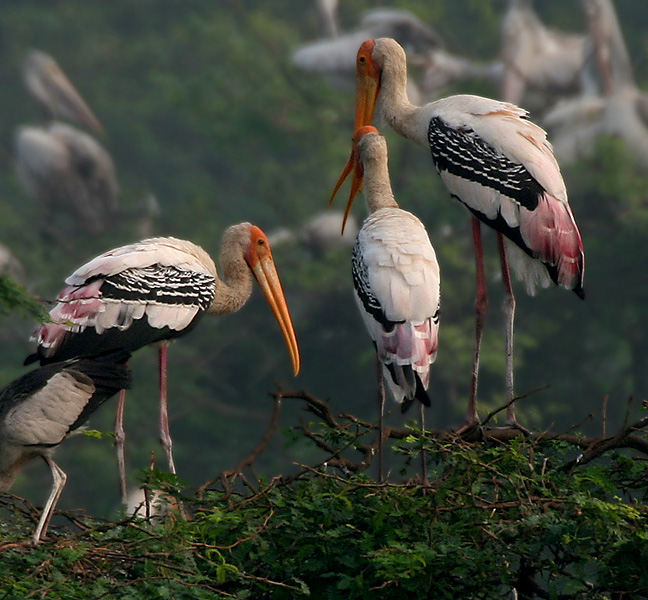
Adults at nest site (Uppalapadu, India). Note white on legs due to urohidrosis.

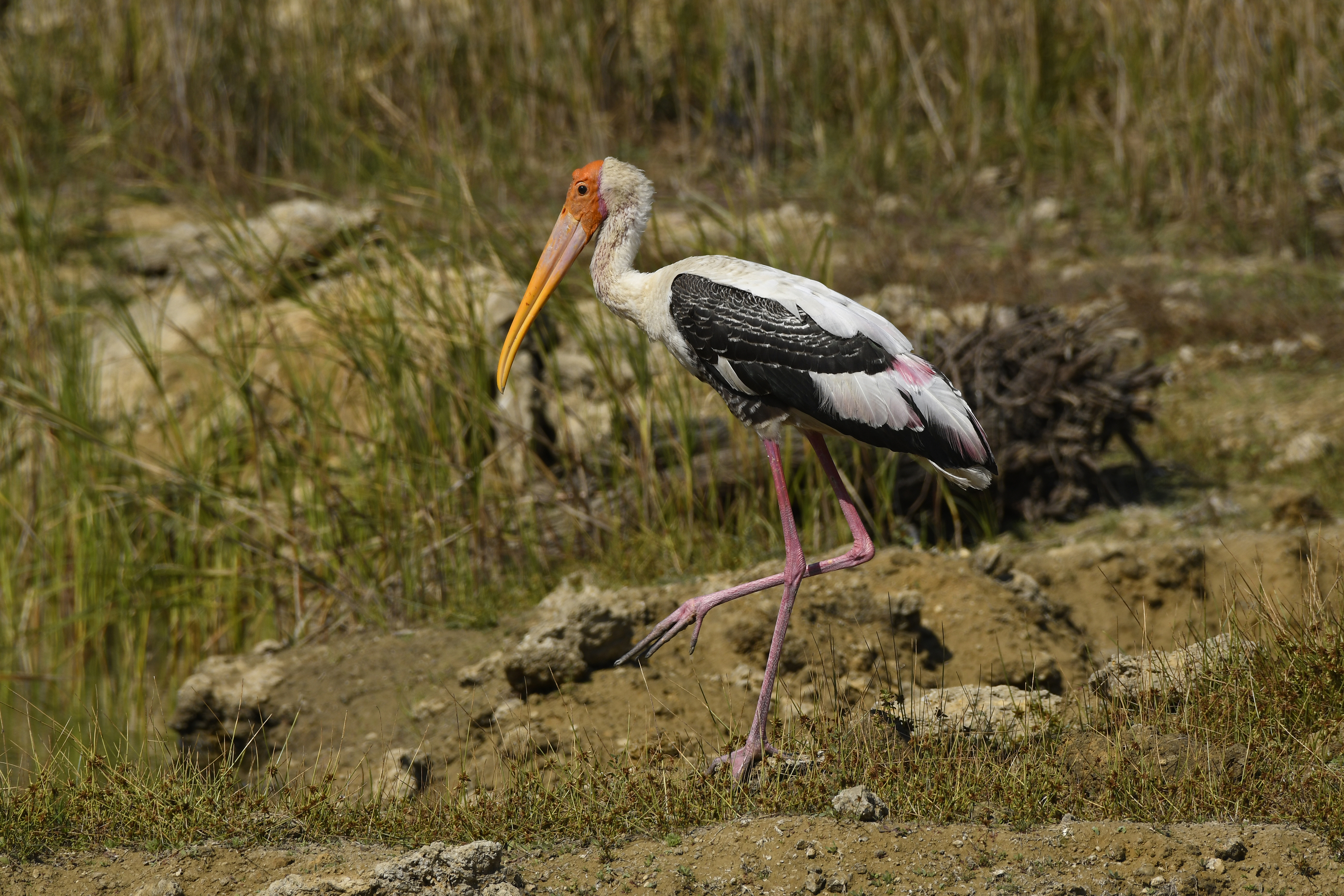
Painted Stork at Jamnagar, India

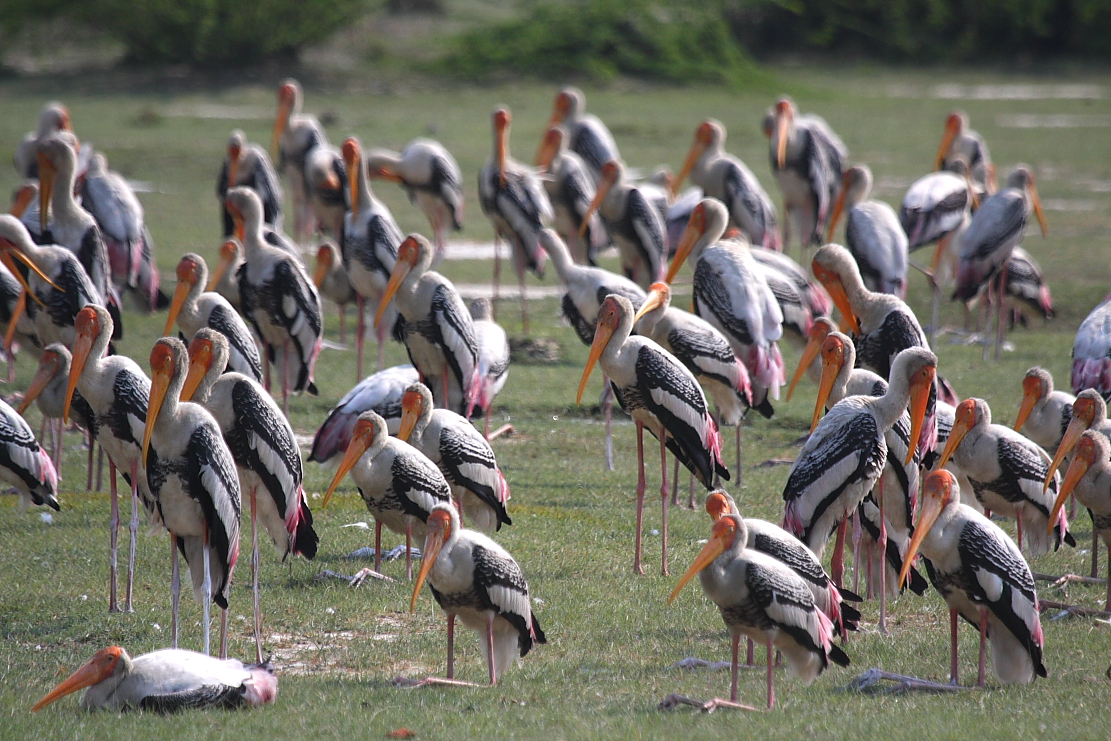
A mixed-age flock resting in a fallow field

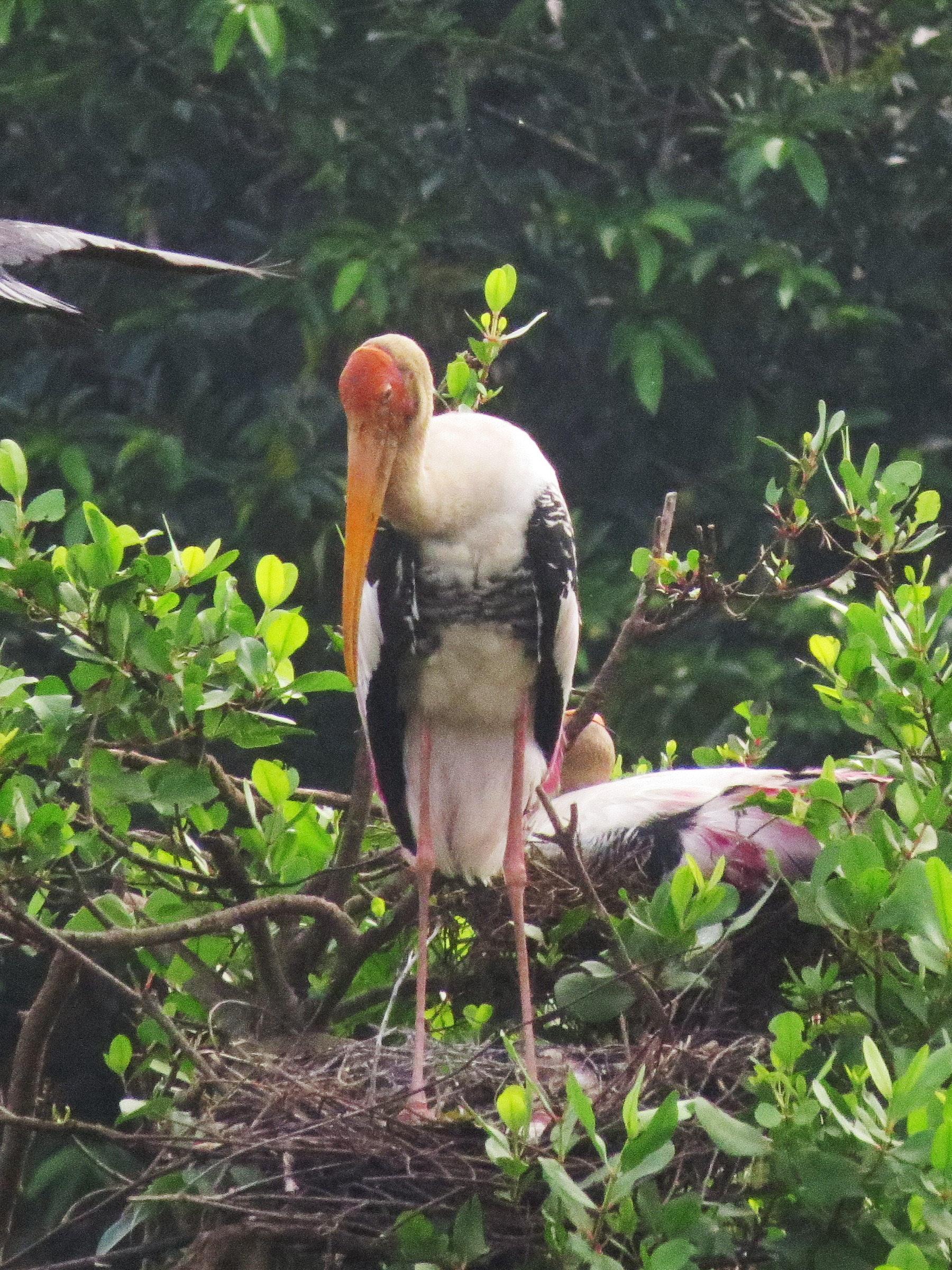
Adult in a nest (Kumarakom Bird Sanctuary, Kerala, India)

== Other sources ==
- Chaleow Salakij, Jarernsak Salakij, Nual-Anong Narkkong, Decha Pitakkingthong and Songkrod Poothong (2003) Hematology, Morphology, Cytochemistry and Ultrastructure of Blood Cells in Painted Stork (Mycteria leucocephala). Kasetsart J. (Nat. Sci.) 37:506-513
- Urfi, A. J. (1997). "The significance of Delhi Zoo for wild water birds, with special reference to the Painted Stork (Mycteria leucocephala)". Forktail. 12: 87–97.
