= Kokrebellur =

Kokrebellur Bird Sanctuary Kokkare Bellur
- Village
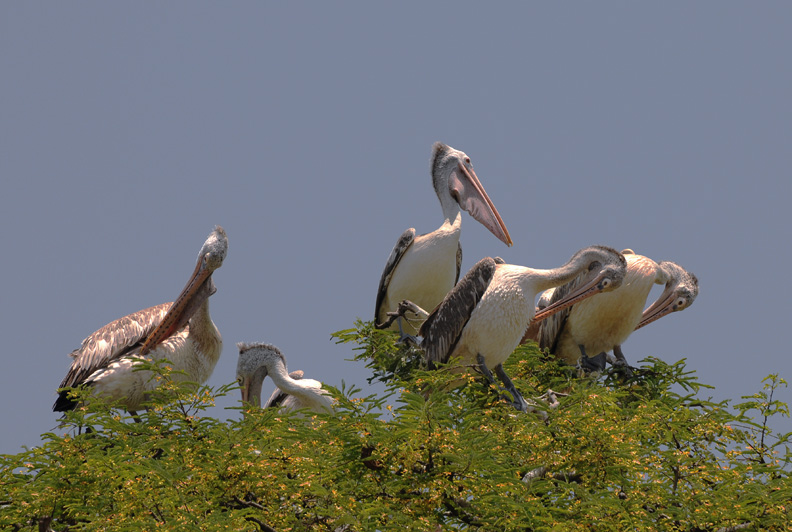

- Location in Karnataka, India Kokrebellur Bird Sanctuary (India)
- Coordinates: 12.511°N 77.091°E
- Country: India
- State: Karnataka
- District: Mandya district

Languages
  - Official: Kannada
- Time zone: UTC+5:30 (IST)
- Painted stork and spot-billed pelican classified as "near threatened" under IUCN3.1 BirdLife International (2016). "Mycteria leucocephala". IUCN Red List of Threatened Species. 2016 e.T22697658A93628598. doi:10.2305/IUCN.UK.2016-3.RLTS.T22697658A93628598.en.

Kokkarebellur Bird Sanctuary, usually shortened by the colloquial usage to Kokrebellur is a village in Maddur taluk of Mandya district of Karnataka, India. The village is named after the painted stork (Mycteria leucocephala), which is called "kokkare" in the native Kannada language. This bird nests here in large numbers every year. The village is situated near Maddur between the cities of Mysore and Bangalore. Apart from painted storks, spot-billed pelicans are also found here in large numbers. Both are classified to be near threatened in the IUCN Red List. The village is one of the 21 breeding sites of those birds in India.

The Kokkarebellur has a long-established bond between the spot-billed pelicans and the villagers who have adopted this bird as their local heritage, since they consider the birds as harbingers of good luck and prosperity to the village. The commercial benefits derived by the villagers from these birds include the phosphorus and potassium-rich manure obtained from the bird droppings (also known as guano). Over the years, the story of this relationship between the villagers and the migratory birds has attracted many tourists to the village.

== Etymology ==
The name of the village "Kokkarebellur" (Kannada - ಕೊಕ್ಕರೆಬೆಳ್ಳೂರು) is derived from two words: 'kokkare' meaning "stork" or "pelican" and 'bellur' meaning" white village

== Geography ==
The village is located 800 metres (2,600 ft) to the west of the Shimsa River. The area in the vicinity of the village offers large water bodies in the form of several large tanks such as the Tailur Kere ('Kere' means "tank"), the Maddur Kere and the Sole Kere that sustain food needs (particularly, fishes and shellfishes) of the pelicans and other birds. The village setting at Kokkarebellur has nesting trees in the form of Ficus (F religiosa, F bengalensis) and tamarind (Tamarindus indica) trees. The Mandya district, where the village is located, has extensive agricultural fields with sugarcane as a major crop. During the season of migration of birds, large colonies of spot-billed pelicans and painted storks are seen nesting, mostly in tamarind trees.

== History ==
History of pelicans here was probably mentioned by T C Jerdon in 1853, which was further expanded by the pioneering efforts of the senior forest official S. G. Neginhal of the Indian Forest Service. In 1976, Neginhal established viable solutions by introducing a compensatory scheme to benefit the villagers for furthering the cause of proliferation of this breed of pelicans. The birds and the villagers have coexisted now in total harmony for several decades. The Karnataka Forest Department compensates the villagers with a fixed sum of money for each tree that is used for nestling by birds, since benefits from the crops (tamarind) from these trees and from the land below the tree are lost.

== Fauna ==
Apart from the pelicans, the other birds found nestling and breeding in the village trees are the painted stork (Ibis leucocephalus), little cormorant (Phalacrocorax niger), black ibis (Pseudibis papillosa), grey heron (Ardea cinerea), black-crowned night heron (Nycticorax nycticorax) and Indian pond heron (Ardeola grayii).

Birds are seen nesting in clusters of 15 to 20 pairs per tree and are thought to use the same tree each year. They arrive after monsoon rains ends in September when the birds create their nests, lay eggs from October to November, thereafter fledge around for three months after laying of eggs, till March and tirelessly feed their hatchlings through the summer season. As summer peaks in May, they re-migrate, year after year, except when they sense drought conditions in their colonial habitat. Village women turning sentimental about the birds returning to their homeland say:

For us, these birds are like a daughter coming home for delivery....

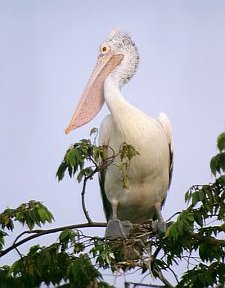
Spot-billed pelican

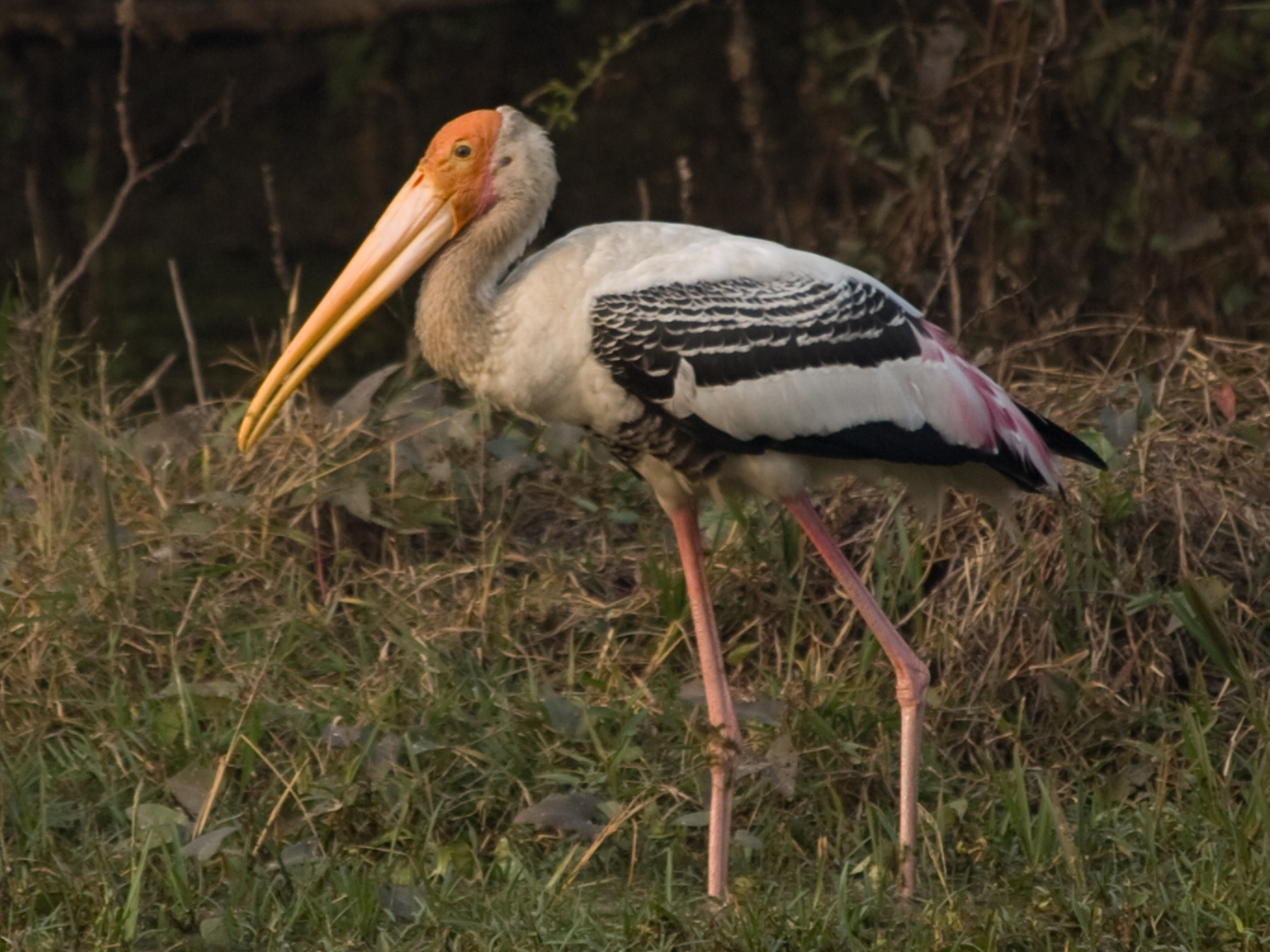
Painted stork

The main species that nest in Kokkarebellur – the spot-billed pelican (Pelecanus phillipensis) and painted stork (Ibis leucocephalus) are given the conservation status of "near threatened category" in the IUCN Red List of 2008.

The birds have distinctly different large anatomical dimensions and colours but both are very active in feeding and protecting their hatchlings. While the painted stork is large in size, the pelican is half this size. Storks have snow-white plumage, lay 2-5 white dotted eggs and have a yellow tapering bill. The pelicans have grey and grayish white plumage, short stout legs, large webbed feet, flat and enormous bill with an elastic bag of purple skin hanging below the throat (that facilitates to collect fish from water surfaces), with length or height in the range of 127–140 centimetres (50–55 in) with tufted crown at the back of the head and lay a maximum of three chalk white eggs at a time.

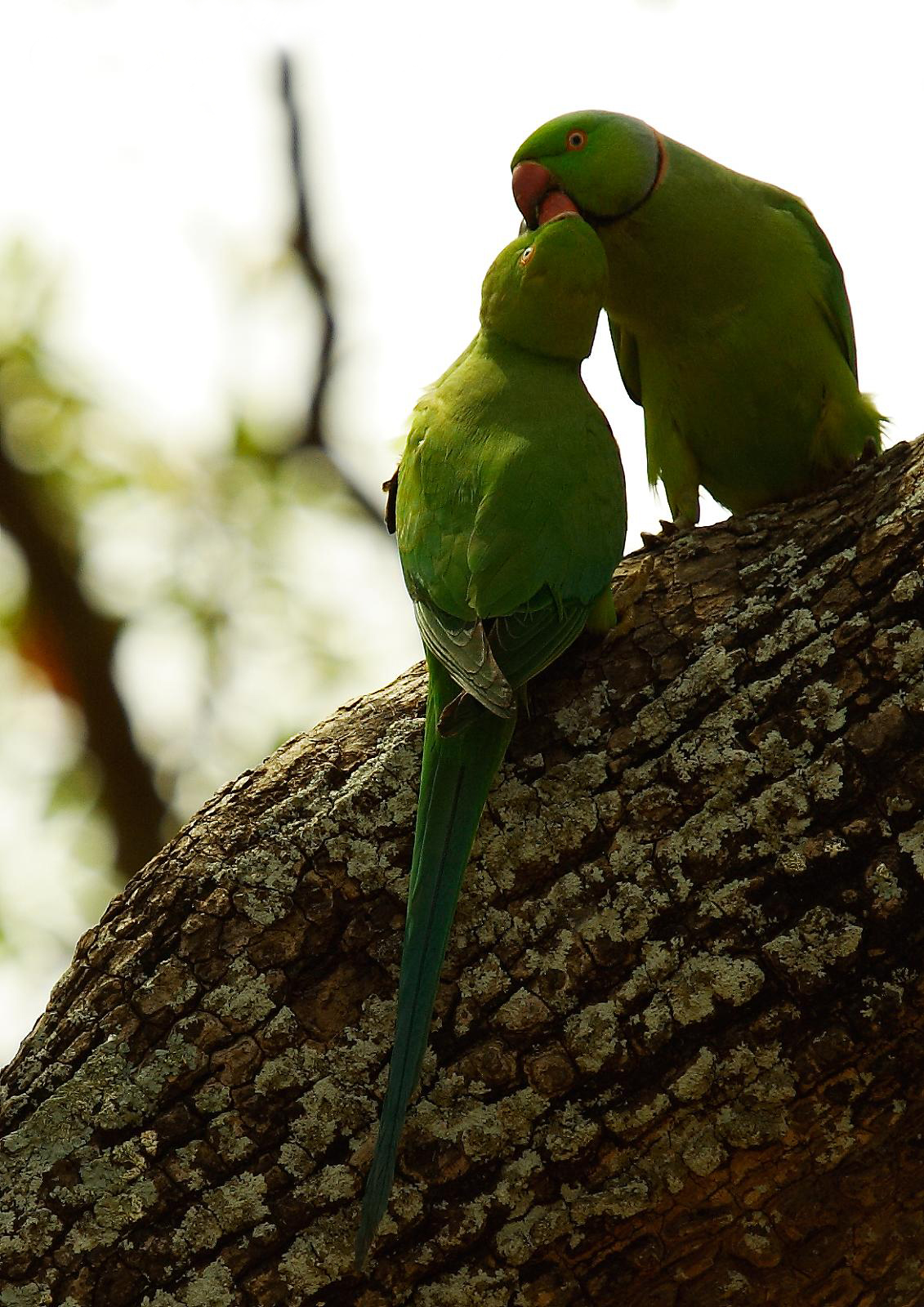
Ring necked parakeets seen in Kokkrebellur

In addition to above birds, there are nearly 250 birds recorded around this area over years.

== Conservation efforts ==
The spot-billed pelicans are protected by law in India and also in several other countries of the region (Sri Lanka, China, Myanmar, Thailand, Cambodia and Laos) to avert threats in the form of tree felling for agricultural purposes. A community-based project has been established to perpetuate historical links of the pelicans with the villagers.

Kokkrebellur is not a reserved forest sanctuary but is a small village where the storks and pelicans coexist freely, mostly in tamarind trees in the middle of the village, in total harmony with the villagers. Consequently, reports indicate increased nestling activity in recent years. Thus, efforts to conserve these birds have been fruitful and hailed as a "role model" for replication at other places.

The Karnataka Forest Department (KFD), the Mandya Zilla Panchayath, the Department of Minor Irrigation and Department of Fisheries and the Karnataka State Tourism Development Corporation (KSTDC) have supported the Local Village Level Committee and NGO organizations to conserve and develop all facilities for the birds. The list of planned activities involved cover the following:

- Establish and provide grants to the Village Forest Committee (VFC) to protect the birds by nurturing and enhancing the trees (ficus (F. religiosa, F. bengalensis) and tamarind (Tamarindus indica) trees) where the birds nest, collect manure generated by the 'guano' or bird droppings of the nestling birds for use by villagers
- Encourage tourism to the village for bird watching and thus assist villagers by way of employment as guides, charging of parking fee for vehicles, camera fee, paid toilet, opportunity for running a restaurant or other tourist facilities
- Provide incentives to the villagers to compensate for the loss of crops (particularly, from the tamarind trees)
- Maintain hygienic environment in the village through establishing adequate water supply and drainage system
- Create food sources for the birds in the tanks (reservoirs) in the vicinity of the village by introducing indigenous fish species (banning commercial carp culture), discourage fishing activities and also de-silt the tanks to maintain water in adequate quantity and quality

'Hejjarle Balaga'(ಹೆಜ್ಜಾರ್ಲೆ ಬಳಗ)(meaning "relatives of pelican") of the Mysore Amateur Naturalists (MAN), an NGO, works in unison with the villagers in providing protection to these birds. The villagers with support from volunteers of the NGOs tend to the injured hatchlings/fledglings that fall from the trees by housing them in exclusively built pens, nurse and feed them with fish caught from nearby water bodies.

Its population in southern India, at 21 locations in the states of Karnataka, Andhra Pradesh and Tamil Nadu, is reported to be about 5,000 birds (2006) (its total population in an area of 181,000 square kilometres (70,000 mi^{2}) in various countries of Asia is reported in the range of 13,000 - 18,000). Kokrebellur, in particular, has the distinction of increasing its spot-billed pelican population by more than double in recent years.

== Access ==
It is well connected by road, rail and air transport networks. It is at a distance of 83 kilometres (52 mi) from Bangalore on the Bangalore-Mysore highway. The branch road to the village is 12 kilometres (7.5 mi) from the highway at the 'Coffee day' landmark, close to Maddur. It is 20 kilometres (12 mi) to the north-east of Mandya. Maddur and Mandya are the closest railway stations on the Mysore-Bangalore broad gauge link. The nearest airport, with daily services to most cities of the country and to some International destinations, is at Bangalore.
