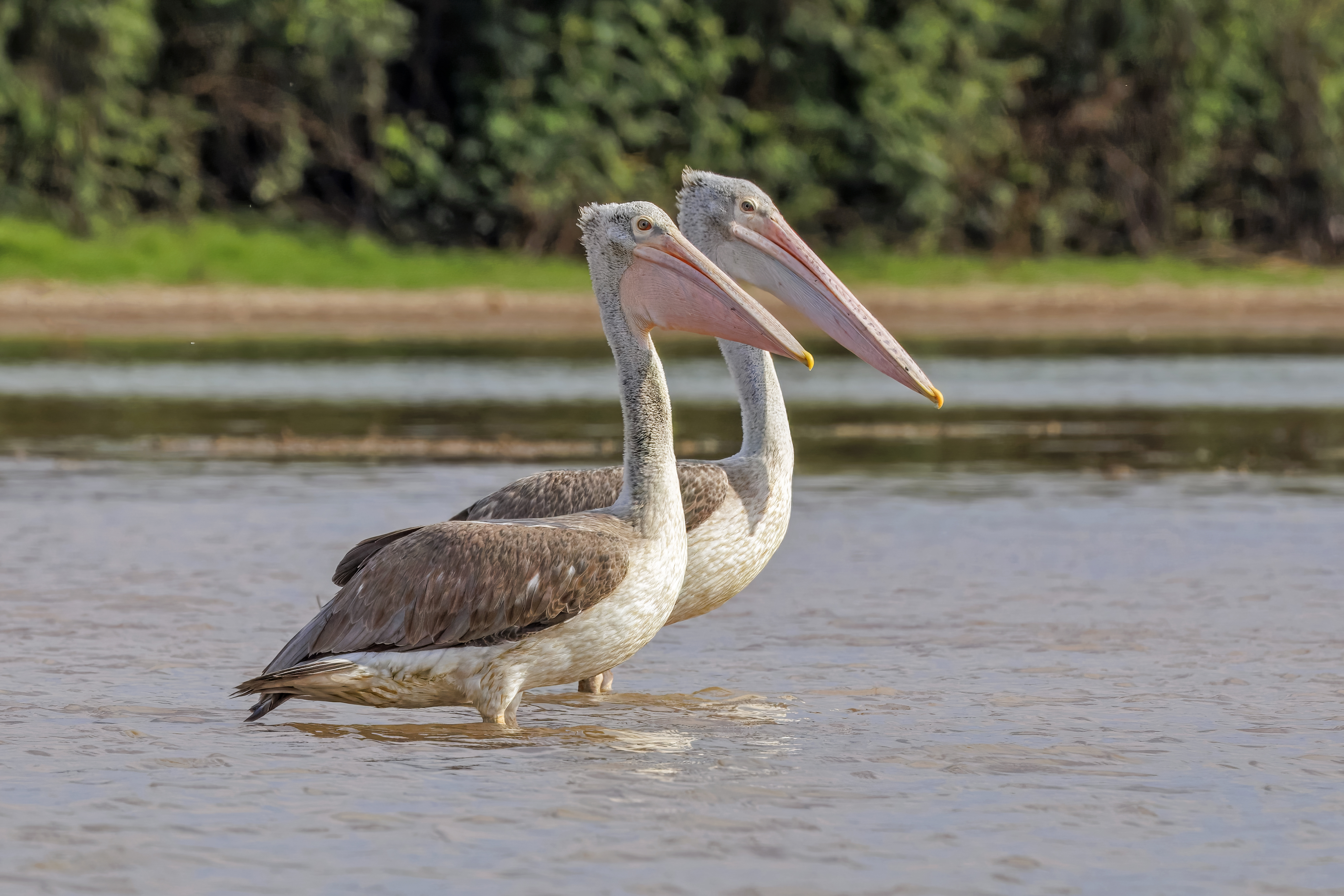
- in Cambodia

Conservation status
- Near Threatened (IUCN 3.1)

Scientific classification
- Kingdom: Animalia
- Phylum: Chordata
- Class: Aves
- Order: Pelecaniformes
- Family: Pelecanidae
- Genus: Pelecanus
- Species: P. philippensis

Binomial name
- Pelecanus philippensis Gmelin, 1789
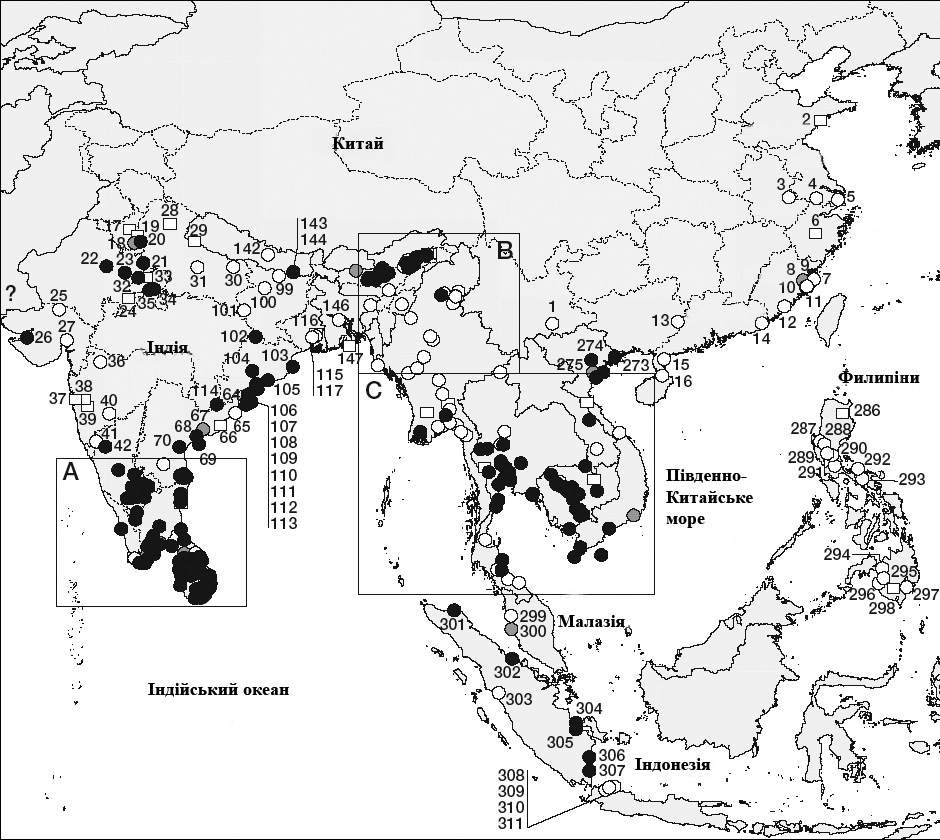

= Spot-billed pelican =

Species of bird

The spot-billed pelican (Pelecanus philippensis) or gray pelican is a member of the pelican family. It breeds in southern Asia from southern Iran across India east to Indonesia. It is a bird of large inland and coastal waters, especially large lakes. At a distance they are difficult to differentiate from other pelicans in the region although it is smaller but at close range the spots on the upper mandible, the lack of bright colours and the greyer plumage are distinctive. In some areas these birds nest in large colonies close to human habitations.

== Taxonomy ==
The spot-billed pelican was formally described in 1789 by the German naturalist Johann Friedrich Gmelin in his revised and expanded edition of Carl Linnaeus's Systema Naturae. He placed it with the other pelicans in the genus Pelecanus and coined the binomial name Pelecanus philippensis. Gmelin based his description on "Le pélican des Philippines" that had been described and illustrated in 1760 by the French zoologist Mathurin Jacques Brisson. Brisson's specimen had been collected on the island of Luzon in the Philippines. The species is monotypic: no subspecies are recognised.

== Description ==
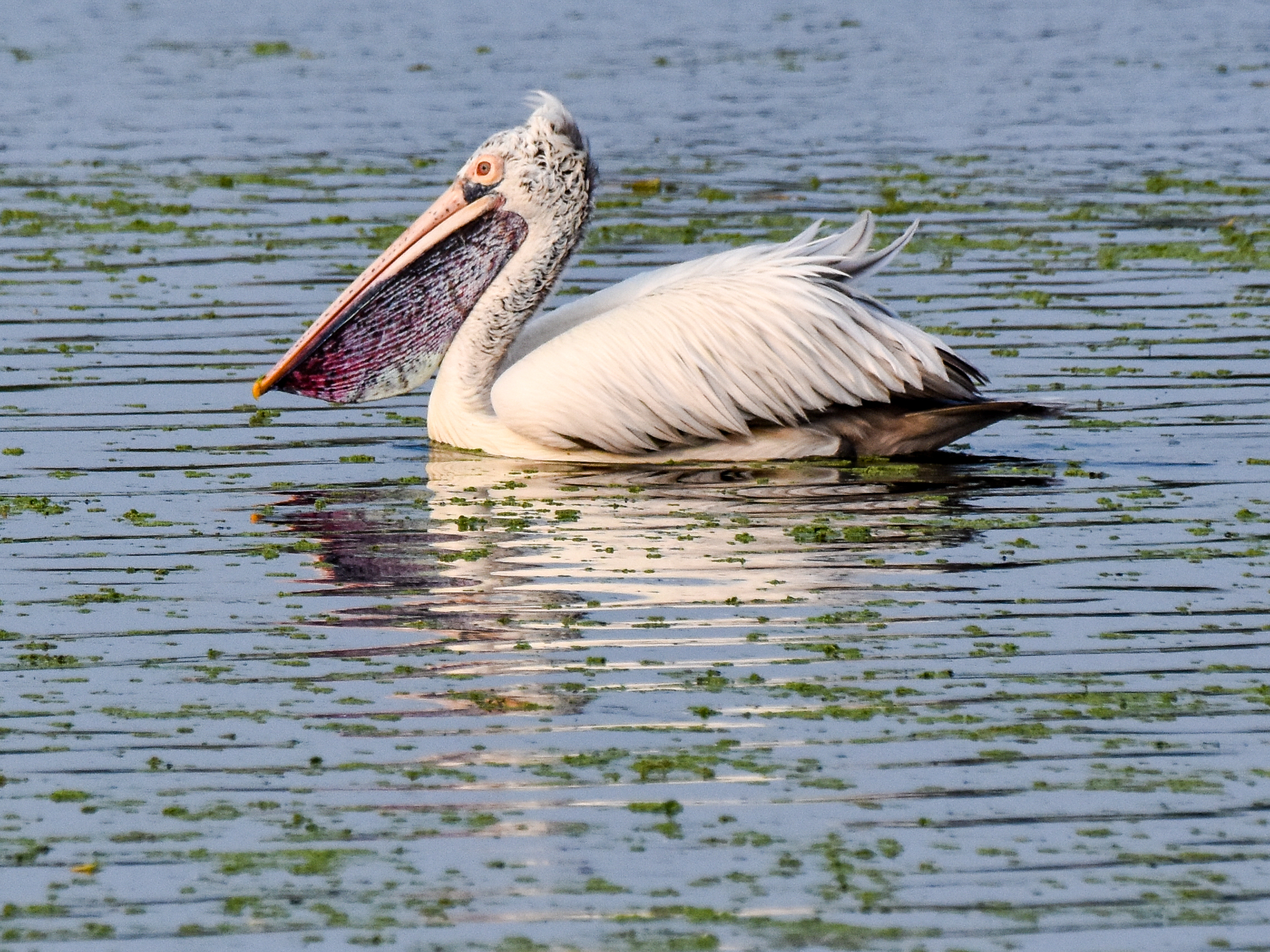
Breeding plumage, Vedanthangal Bird Sanctuary, India

The spot-billed pelican is a rather large water bird, often the largest or one of the largest native birds in the southern stretches of its range, albeit it is fairly small for a pelican. It is 125–152 cm (49–60 in) long and a weight of 4.1–6 kg (9.0–13.2 lb). The wingspan can vary from 213 to 250 cm (7 ft 0 in to 8 ft 2 in) while the typically large beak measured from 285 to 355 mm (11.2 to 14.0 in). It is mainly white, with a grey crest, hindneck and a brownish tail. The feathers on the hind neck are curly and form a greyish nape crest. The pouch is pink to purplish and has large pale spots, and is also spotted on the sides of the upper mandible. The tip of the bill (or nail) is yellow to orange. In breeding plumage, the skin at the base of the beak is dark and the orbital patch is pink. In flight they look not unlike the Dalmatian pelican but the tertials and inner secondaries are darker and a pale band runs along the greater coverts. The tail is rounder.

The newly hatched young are covered in white down. They then moult into a greyish speckled plumage. The spots on the bill appear only after a year. The full adult breeding plumage appears in their third year.

== Distribution and habitat ==
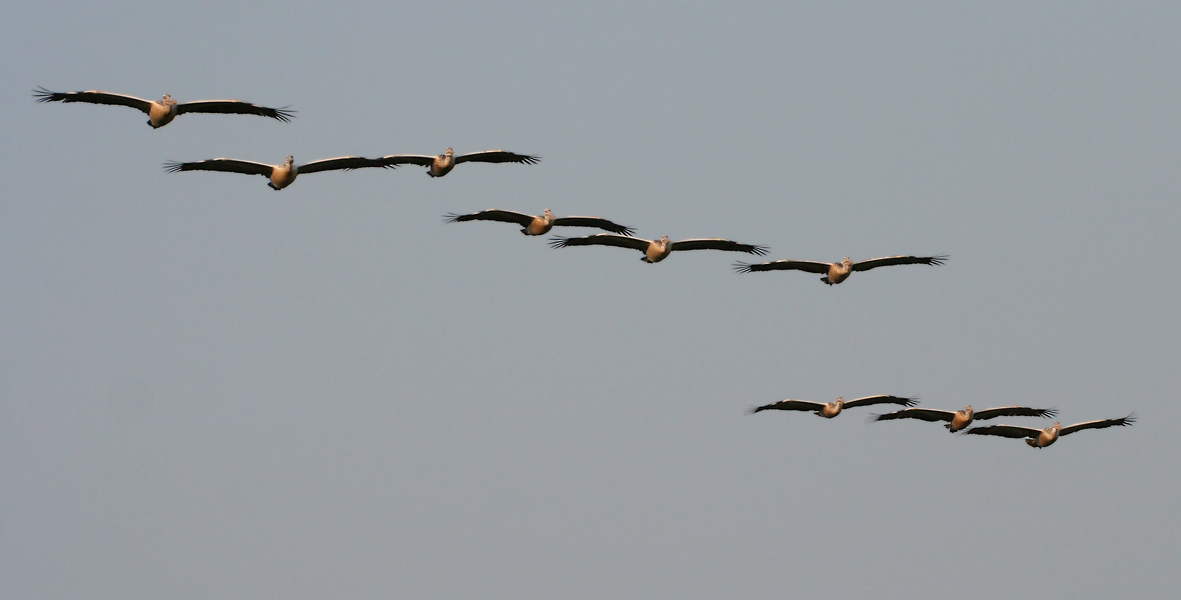
Flocks fly in formation

The species is found to breed only in peninsular India, Sri Lanka and in Cambodia. A few birds from India are known to winter in the Gangetic plains but reports of its presence in many other parts of the region such as the Maldives, Pakistan and Bangladesh has been questioned. The main habitat is in shallow lowland freshwaters. The spot-billed pelican is not migratory but are known to make local movements and are more widely distributed in the non-breeding season.

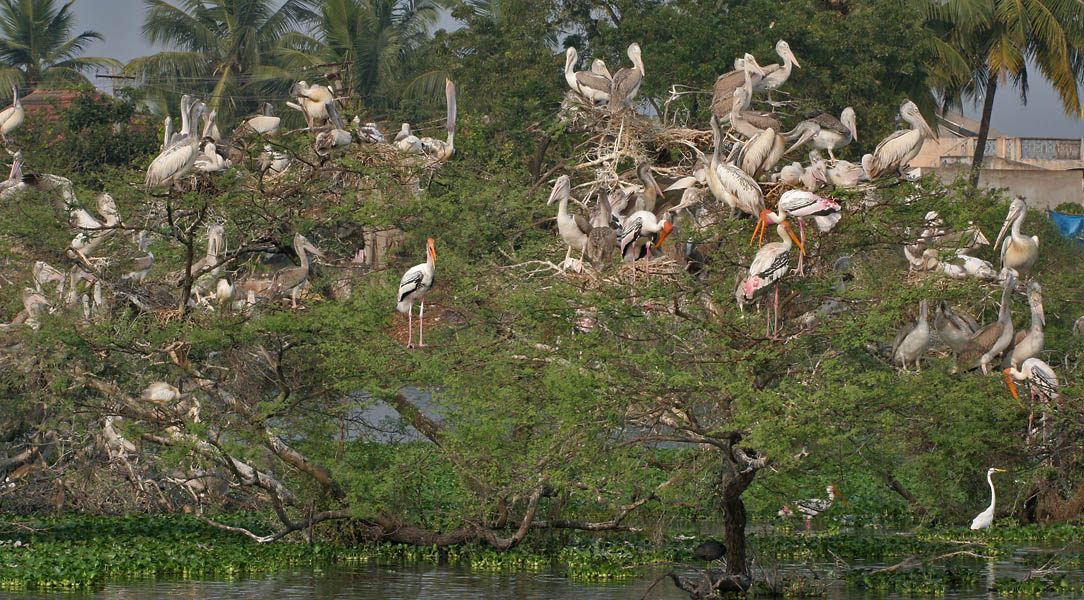
Nesting along with painted storks

This species is a colonial breeder, often breeding in the company of other waterbirds. The nests are on low trees near wetlands and sometimes near human habitations. Many large breeding colonies have been recorded and several have disappeared over time. In June 1906, C E Rhenius visited a colony in Kundakulam in Tirunelveli district where the villages considered the birds semi-sacred. The same colony was revisited in 1944, and was found to have about 10 nests of pelicans and nearly 200 nests of painted stork.

The Sittang River in Burma was said by E W Oates to have "millions" of pelicans in 1877 and in 1929 E C Stuart Baker reported that they were still nesting in thousands along with greater adjutant storks:

The whole forest consisted of very large trees, but a portion, about one in twenty, was made up of wood-oil trees, gigantic fellows, 150 feet high and more, and with a smooth branchless trunk of 80 to 100 feet. These are the trees selected by the pelicans.
I was out that day till 3 p.m., continually moving, and must have walked at least twenty miles in various directions, but never from first to last was I out of sight of either a Pelican's or Adjutant's nest. From what I saw, and from what the Burmans told me, I compute the breeding-place of these birds to extend over an area about twenty miles long and five broad.

— Oates (1877) quoted in Hume (1890)

This colony was however reported by B E Smythies to have disappeared between the 1930s and the 1940s.

Another colony was discovered in 1902 at a village called Buchupalle in the Cudappah district, where these pelicans nested along with painted storks during the month of March. This colony was never traced again. The Kolleru Lake colony was discovered by K K Neelakantan in 1946. Nearly 3000 pelicans nested in this colony at the time of discovery. This colony however disappeared around 1975.

Due to habitat loss and human disturbance, the spot-billed pelican's numbers have declined and many populations in Southeast Asia (including parts of China) are now extinct. The specific name refers to the Philippines, where the species was abundant in the early 1900s but declined and become locally extinct in the 1960s. The populations in southern India are thought to be on the rise. Estimates suggest that increased protection has since enabled a recovery in their numbers and the status of the species was changed from vulnerable to near threatened in the 2007 IUCN Red List.

== Behaviour and ecology ==
They are very silent although at their nests they can make hisses, grunts or snap their bills. Some early descriptions of nesting colonies have claimed them to be distinctive in their silence but most have noted colonies as noisy.

Like most other pelicans, it catches fish in its huge bill pouch while swimming at the surface. Unlike the great white pelican it does not form large feeding flocks and is usually found to fish singly or in small flocks. Groups may however sometimes line up and drive fish towards the shallows. When flying to their roosts or feeding areas, small groups fly in formation with steady flapping. During the hot part of the day, they often soar on thermals. They may forage at night to some extent.

The birds nest in colonies and the nest is a thick platform of twigs placed on a low tree. The breeding season varies from October to May. In Tamil Nadu, the breeding season follows the onset of the northeast monsoon. The courtship display of the males involves a distention of the pouch with swinging motions of the head up and down followed by sideways swings followed by the head being held back over the back. Bill claps may also be produced during the head swaying movements. The nests are usually built alongside other colonial waterbirds, particularly painted storks. Three to four chalky white eggs is the usual clutch. The eggs become dirty with age. Eggs hatch in about 30–33 days. The young stay in or near the nest from three to five months. In captivity the young are able to breed after two years. Like other pelicans, they cool themselves using gular fluttering and panting.

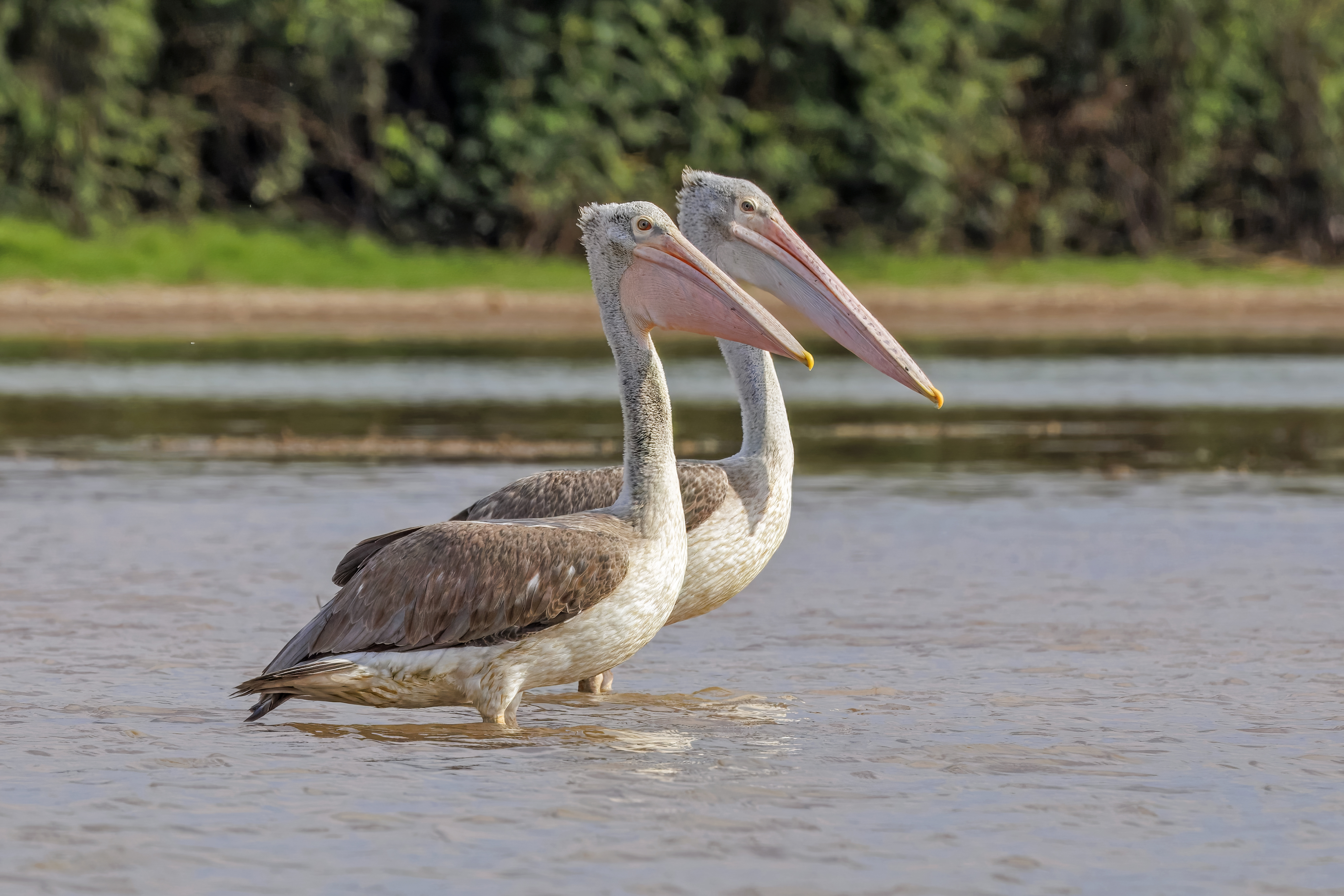
in Cambodia

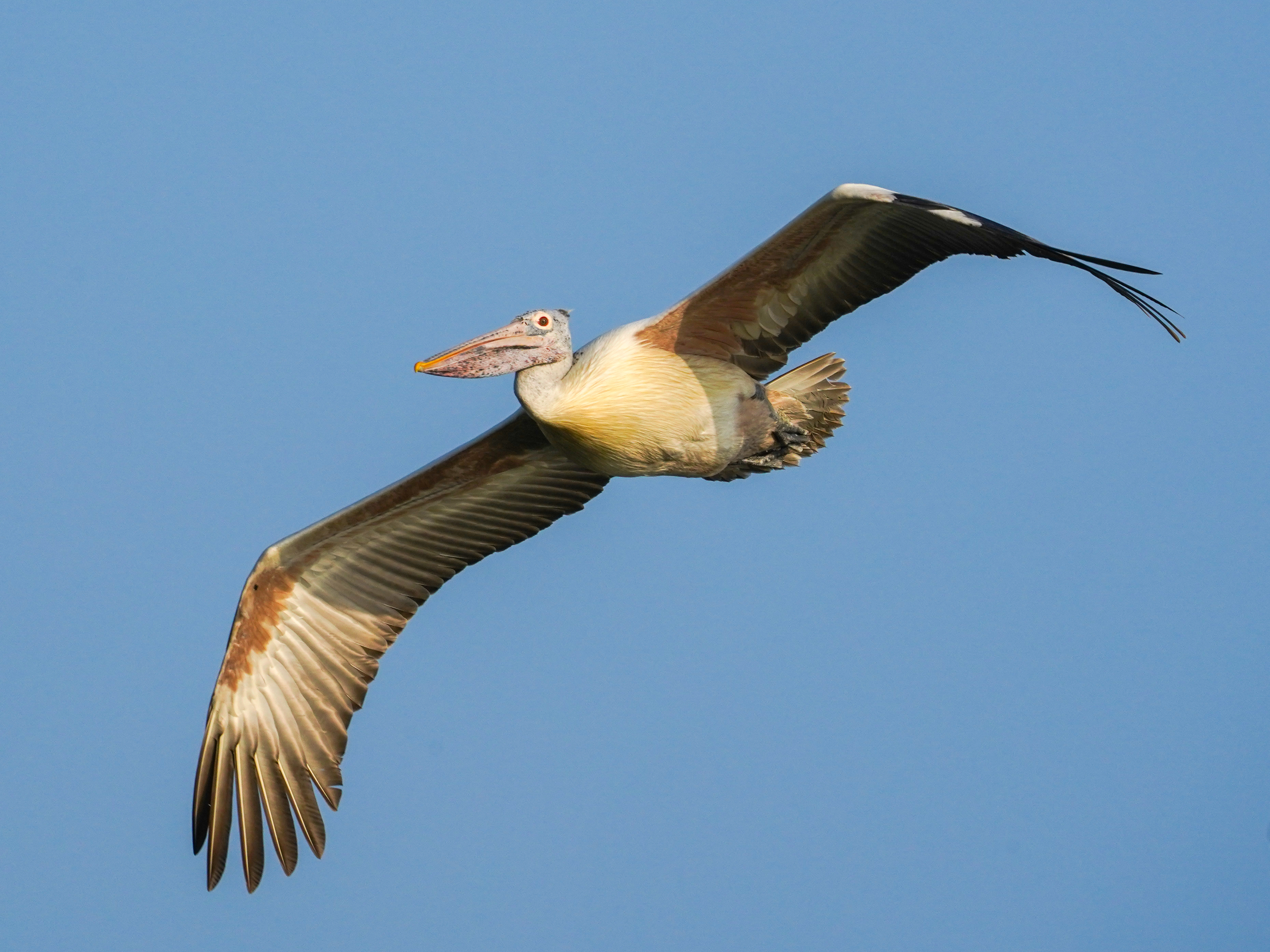
at Karnataka, India

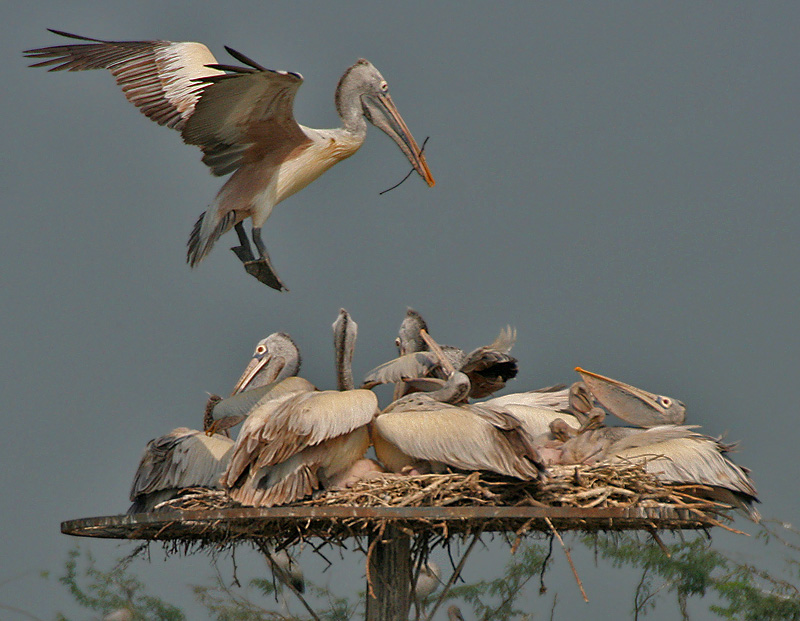
at Andhra Pradesh, India

The trematode parasite Renicola pelecani was described from the kidneys of a specimen of a Sri Lankan spot-billed pelican that died at the London zoo. An ascarid parasite, Pelecanascaris deodhari has been described from a specimen from Mumbai.

== In culture ==
This species was once used by fishermen in parts of eastern Bengal as decoys for certain fish. These fishermen believed that an oily secretion from the bird attracted certain fish such as Colisa and Anabas.

The propensity of these birds to nest close to human habitations has been noted from the time of T C Jerdon:

I have visited on Pelicanry in the Carnatic, where the Pelicans have (for ages I was told) built their rude nests, on rather low trees in the midst of a village, and seemed to care little for the close and constant proximity of human beings.

— Jerdon, 1864

Several colonies have since been discovered and while many of these have vanished others have been protected and a few villages with nesting colonies have become popular tourist attractions. Well known villages with colonies include Kokrebellur, Koothankulam and Uppalapadu.
