= S. G. Neginhal =

Indian forest conservationist (1929–2021)

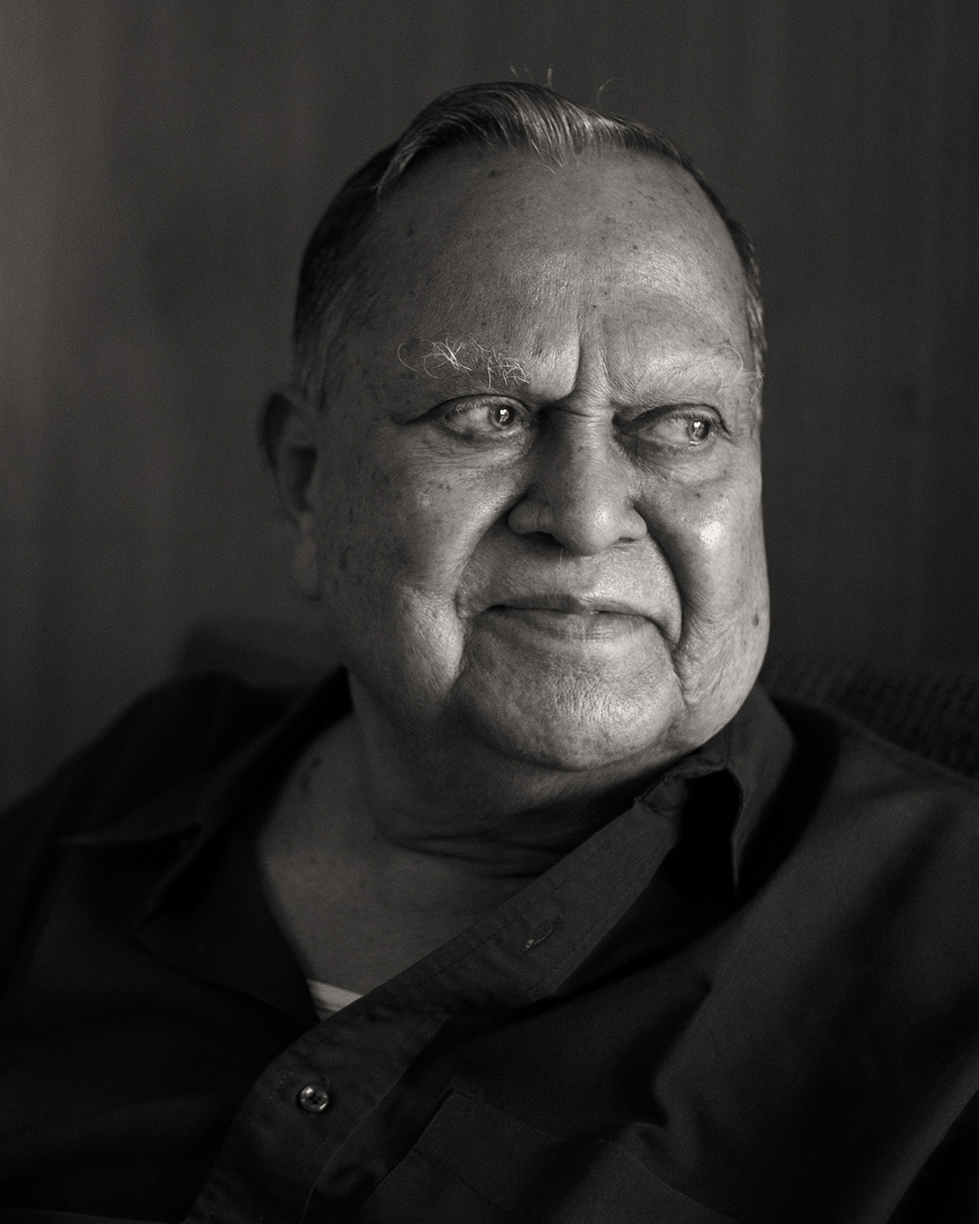
- Neginhal in 2015
- Born: Sethuram Gopalrao Neginhal; 1 May 1929; Dharwad, Bombay Presidency, British India
- Died: 2 May 2021 (aged 92); Bangalore, Karnataka, India
- Occupations: Forest and wildlife conservationist
- Children: 5

Sethuram Gopalrao Neginhal (1 May 1929 – 2 May 2021) was an Indian forest official and conservationist who is credited with generating the green cover around the Indian city of Bangalore leading to the city being referred to as The Garden City. He was associated with the launch of Project Tiger and led wildlife conservation actions including development of the Bandipur Tiger Reserve. In addition to being an expert on wildlife and plant life he was an awarded wildlife photographer.

== Early life ==
Neginhal was born in Dharwad, then a part of the Bombay Presidency in British India on 1 May 1929. His father Gopalrao was a forest officer who had trained at the Rangers College in Dehradun. He credited the experiences with his father as an inspiration for his love of the forests and him following in his father's footsteps. He completed his education in the city of Dharwad in the northern part of the state. During his high school days he participated in the Quit India Movement. He trained as a Range Forest Officer in Dharwad in 1951 before going on to become an officer of the Indian Forest Service.

== Career ==
Neginhal started his career as an officer of the Indian Forest Service in 1972 with a posting in Mysore as a wildlife officer in charge of Bandipur National Park, Nagarhole National Park, Ranganathittu Bird Sanctuary, and the Billigirirangana hills. He served as the head of the Bandipur Tiger Conservation Project in 1973 contributing to state led efforts towards conservation of the tiger population and development of the Bandipur Tiger Reserve. He helped establish Bandipur as the first reserve in Karnataka to be brought under Project Tiger and was also noted to have coined the term Tiger Reserve for a protected region which was later incorporated into the Wildlife Protection Act as an amendment in 2007. During this time, he also helped identify and develop the bird sanctuary in Kokrebellur in Karnataka. He retired as the principal chief surveyor of forests in Karnataka.

Neginhal is credited with the creation of the green cover around the city of Bangalore in the 1980s which led to the city being referred to as The Garden City. He was the deputy conservator of forests between 1982 and 1987 during which the then Karnataka state government under R. Gundu Rao appointed him the chief of the urban green project. He was appointed lead in a special cell within the Forest Department. During this time, he used his knowledge of the native flowering plants and trees and identified flora suited to Bangalore's weather and had them planted along roadsides and other open areas. Considered a pioneer of Urban forestry in India, he and his team of volunteers went door to door asking residents for their choice of trees to be planted in front of their houses. Along with volunteers he planted more than 15 lakh (1.5 million) trees in the city. Some of the plants and trees introduced in the city during this period included bougainvilleas, raintrees, and akashamallige. It is noted that the then Indian prime minister Rajiv Gandhi sought plant species from Neginhal to plant at the memorial of his mother and former prime minister Indira Gandhi at Shakti sthal. He remained close to conservation through the later part of his life and had spoken out against felling of trees toward development of the urban space in Bangalore.

Neginhal was also a wildlife photographer and received the TNA Perumal Memorial national photography award in 2017 for his photography. He was also a member of the Youth Photographic Society in Karnataka. He also took a special interest in birds and accompanied Salim Ali in Bandipur and the Biligirirangan Hills in 1974.

== Awards ==
His involvement in the urban forestry exercise of such a large scale helped the Karnataka Forest Department (Bangalore Urban Division) win the Indira Priyadarshini Vriksha Mitra Award instituted by the Ministry of Environment and Forests, Government of India, for the outstanding greening of the city. Bharatiya Vidya Bhavan and E Hanumantha Rao Trust bestowed upon him the Wild-Life Photography Award for 2012 and The Kumble Foundation presented him with "Outstanding Civil Servant Award" in 2010, for his contributions to forestry and wildlife.

== Personal life ==
Neginhal died on 2 May 2021, of complications from COVID-19. He had turned 92 the day before. He was married and had a son and four daughters.

== Works ==
- Neginhal, S. G. (12 February 2020). Forest trees of South India. Notion Press. ISBN 978-1-64760-636-7. OCLC 1144090536.
- Neginhal, S. G. (1994). Your Bangalore: The Trees. Bangalore Urban Art Commission.
- Neginhal, S. G. (2006). Golden Trees, Greenspaces, and Urban Forestry. S.G. Neginhal. ISBN 978-81-901420-3-8.
- Neginhal, S. G. (2009). Sanctuaries and Wildlife of Karnataka. S. G. Neginhal. ISBN 978-81-901420-4-5.
- Neginhal, S. G. (2011). Forest Trees of the Western Ghats: Includes Eastern Ghats and Deccan Plateau. Indian Forest Service. ISBN 978-93-5067-173-3.
- Neginhal, S. G. (2020). Forest Trees of South India. Notion Press. ISBN 978-1-64760-637-4.

== Gallery ==
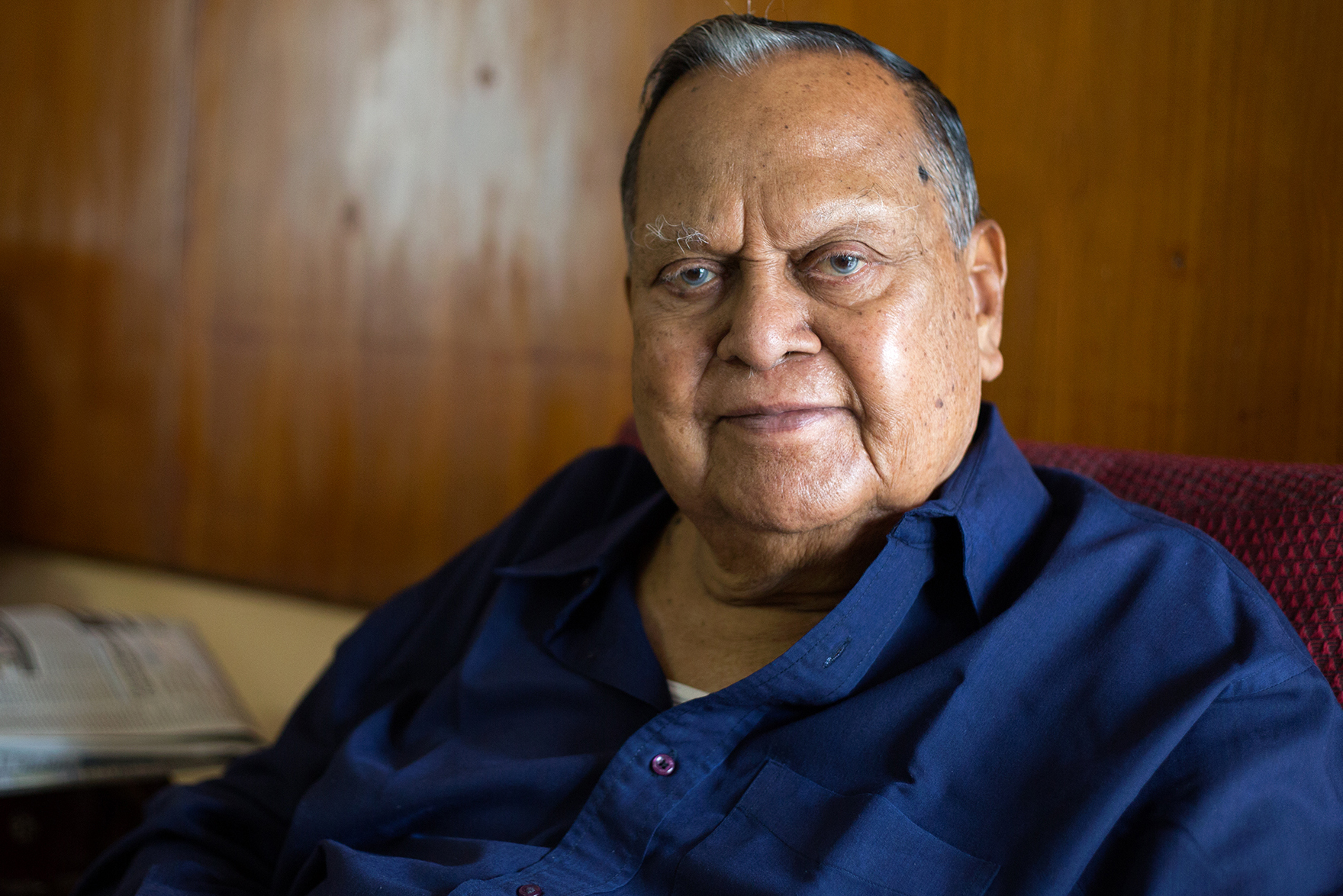
SG Neginhal

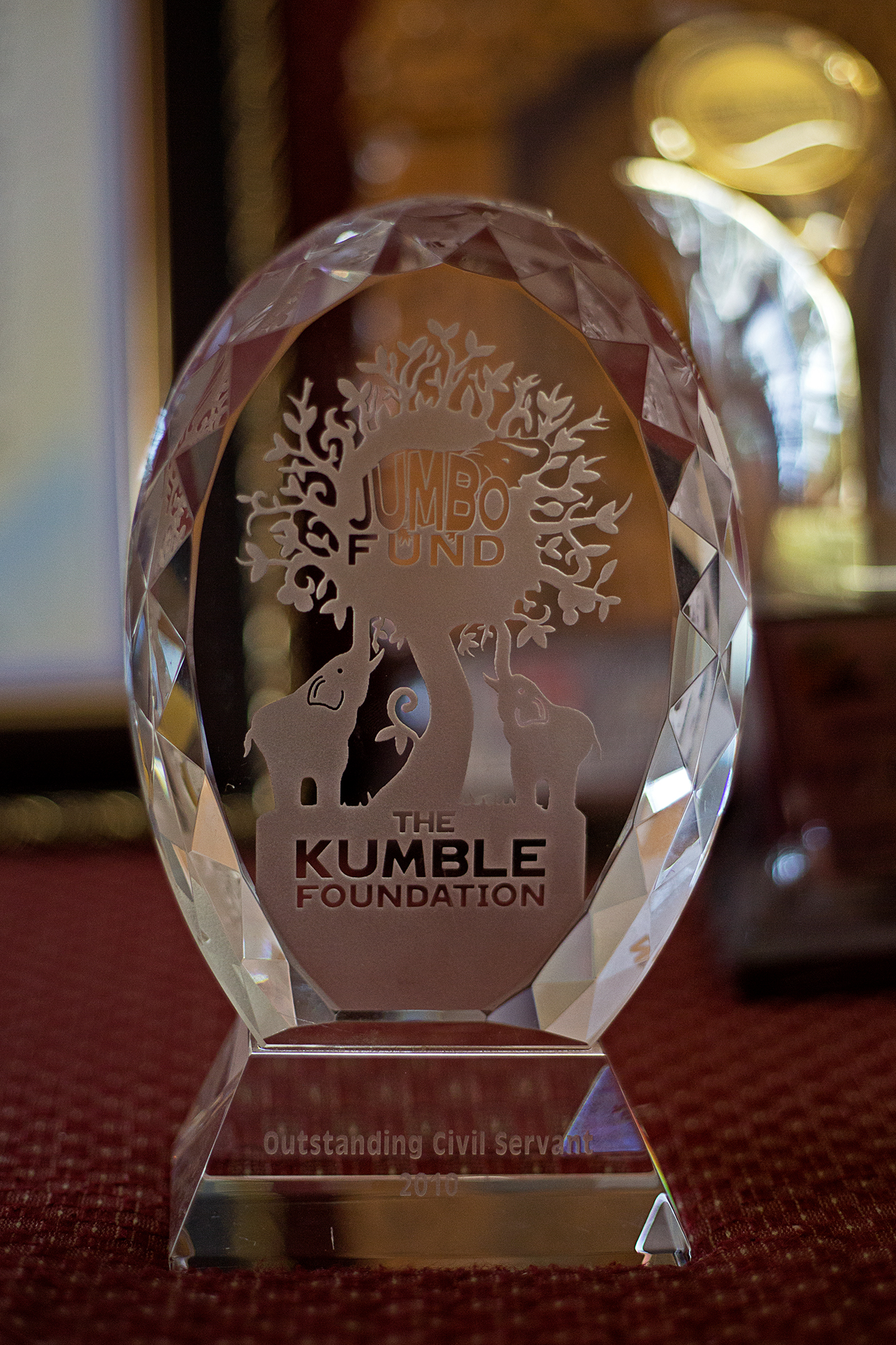
Outstanding Civil Servant award

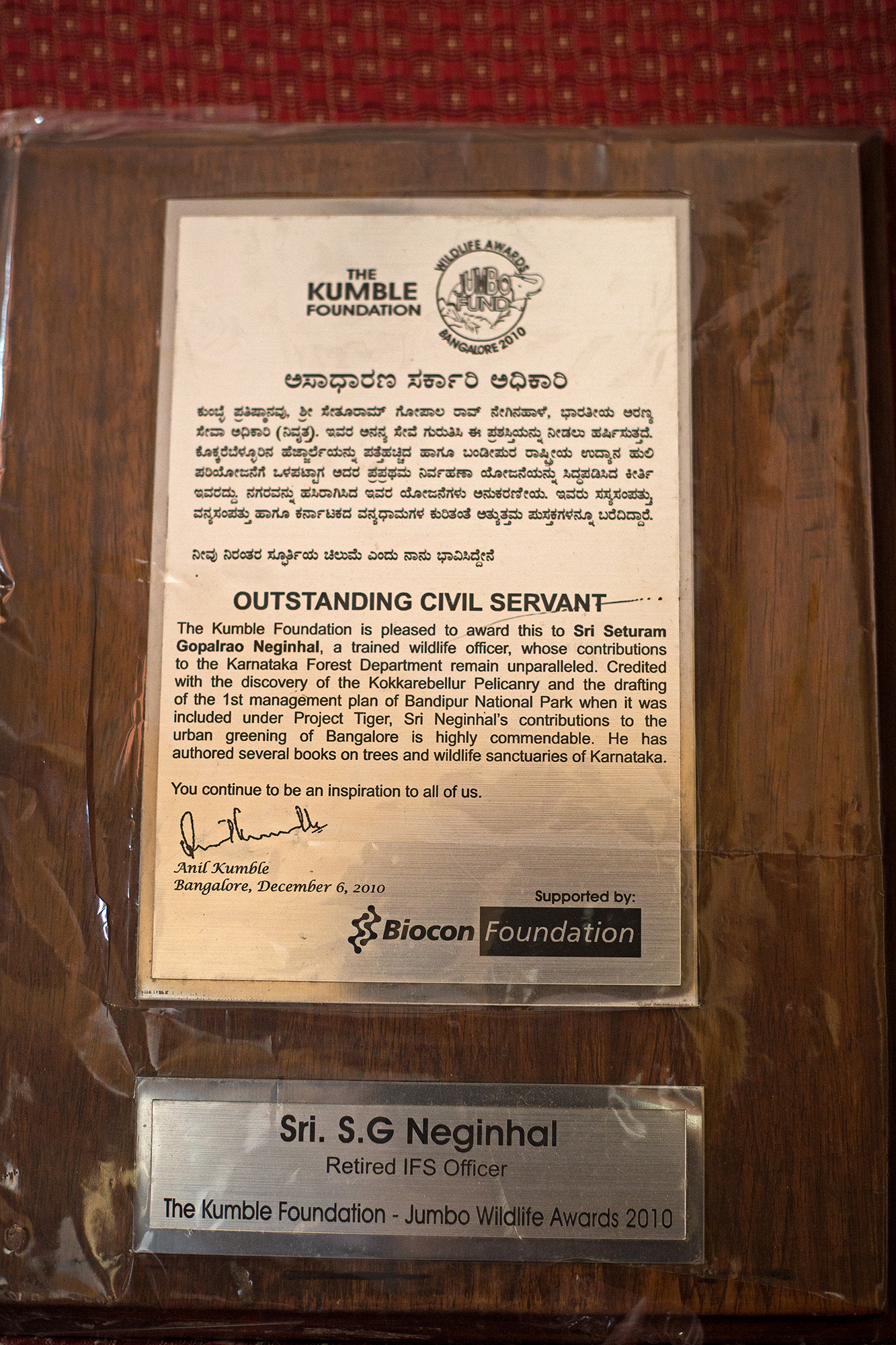
Citation of the Outstanding Civil Servant Award award

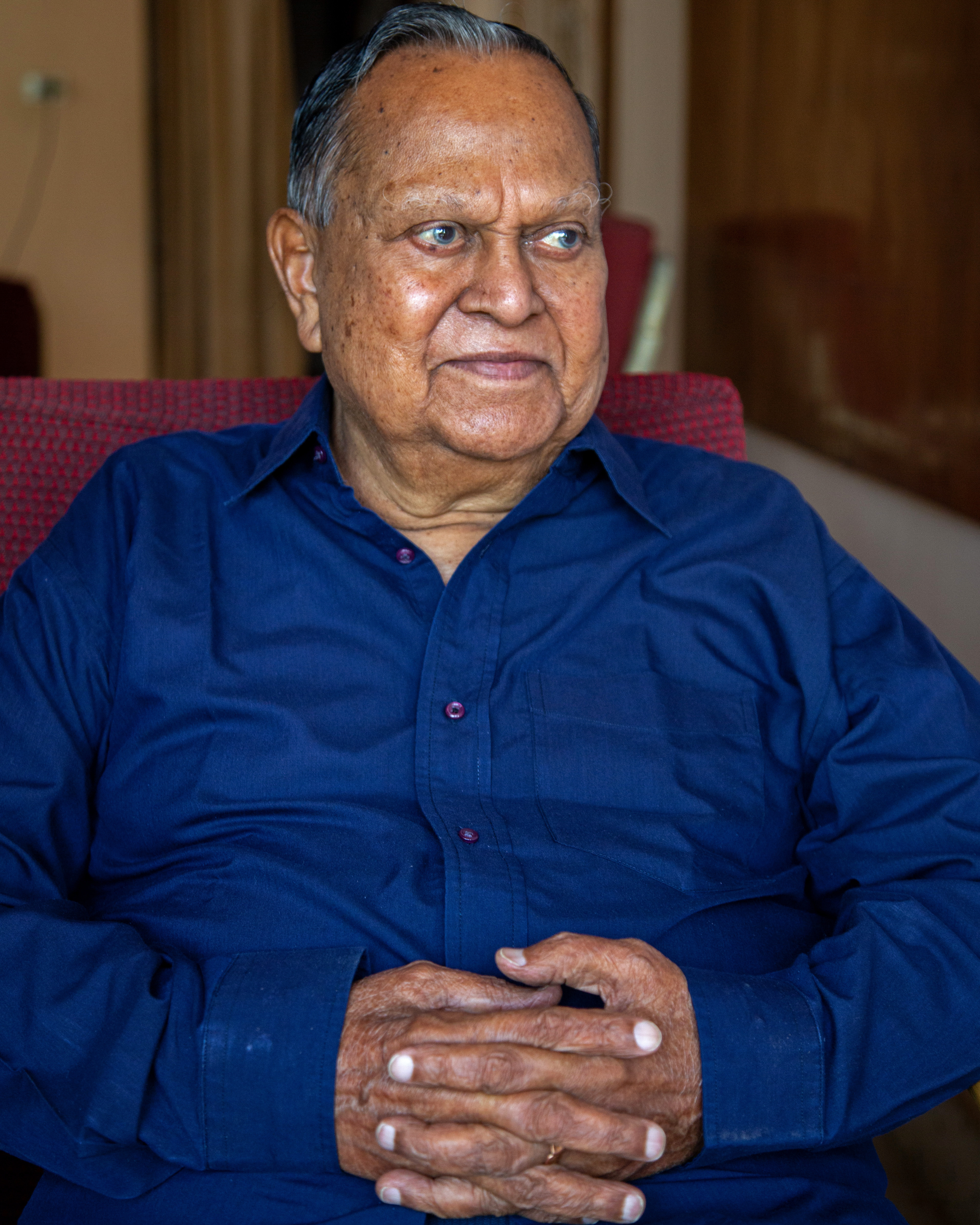
At his residence in Bengaluru

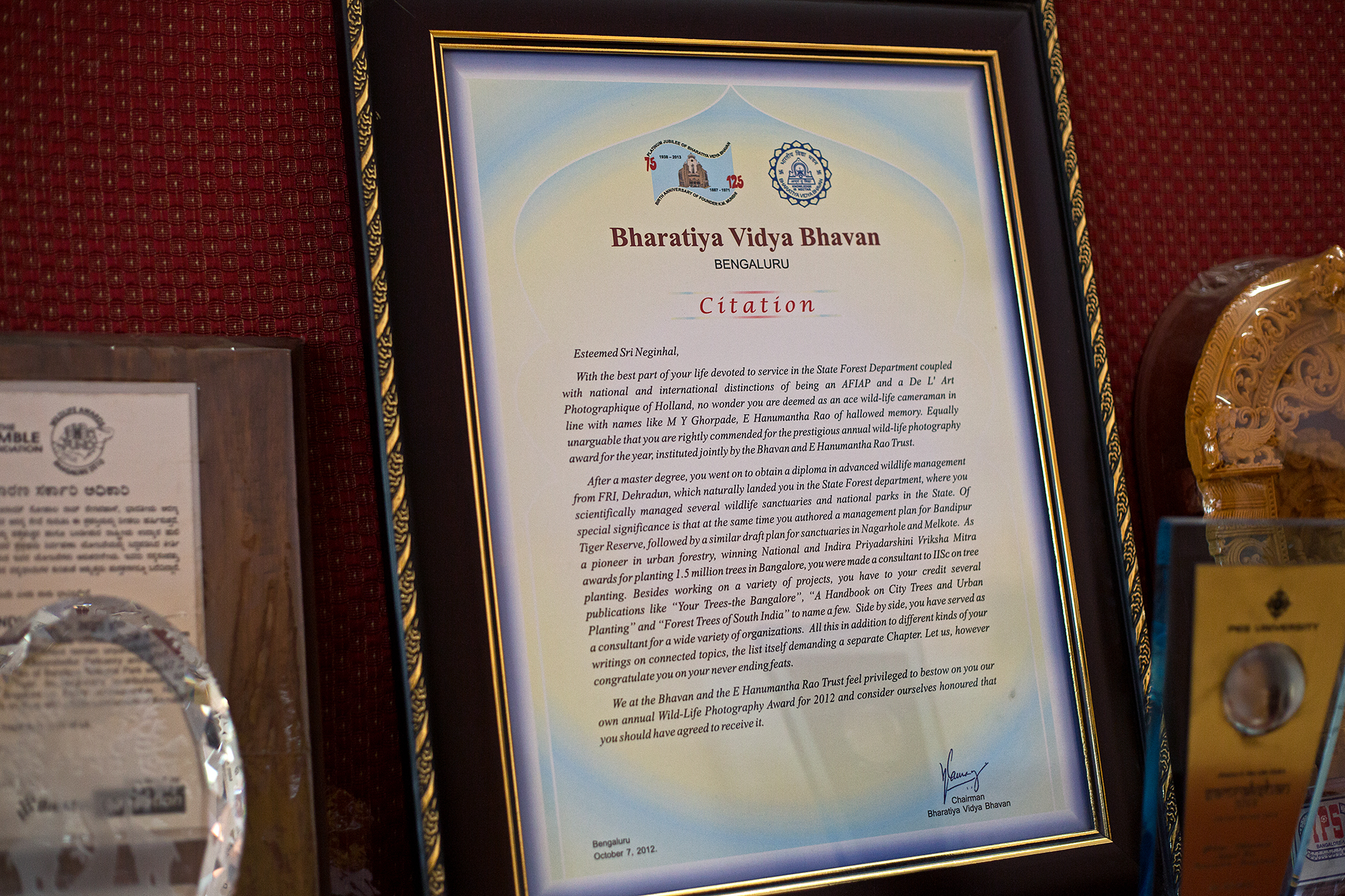
Wildlife Photography Award, 2012

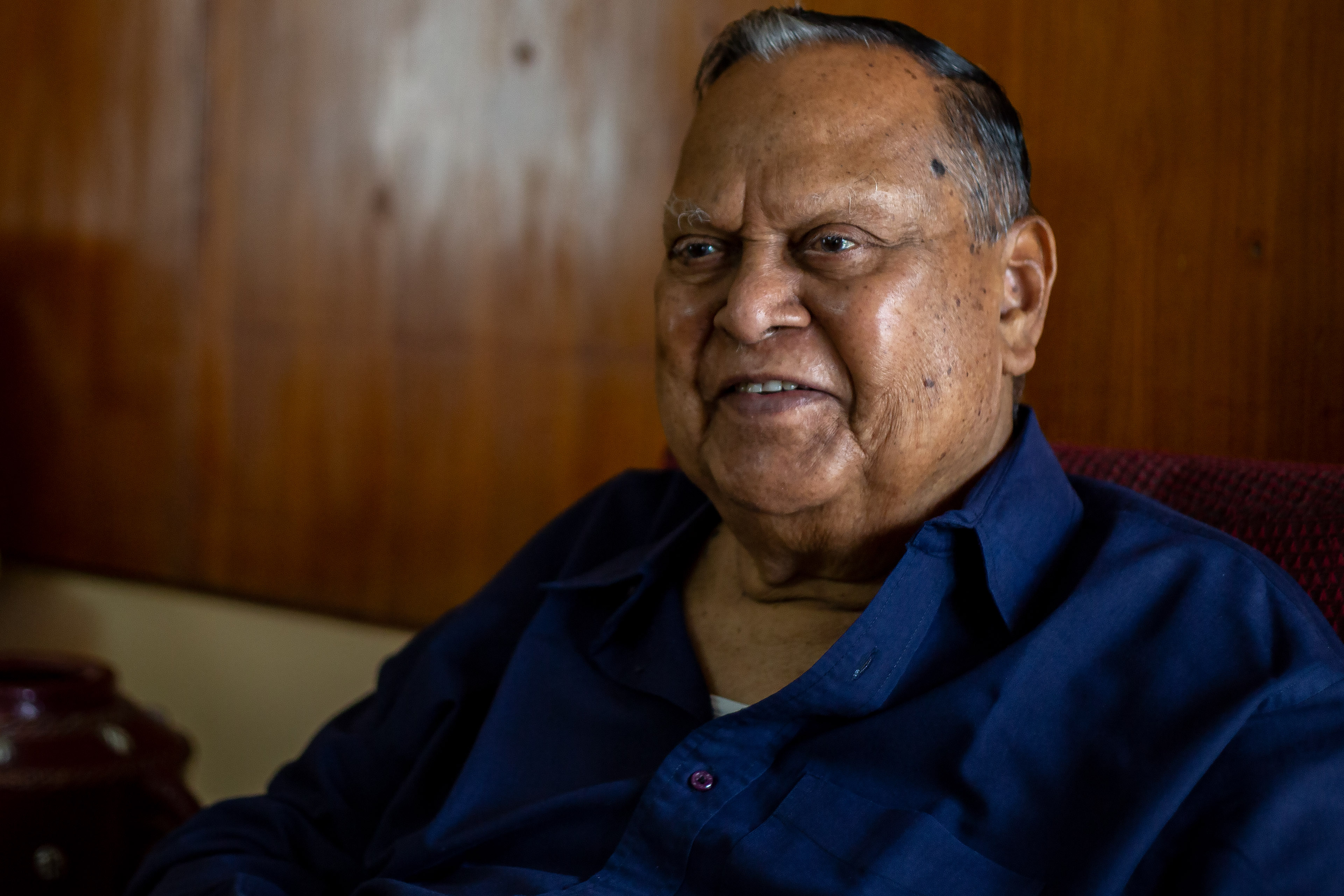
