= Hosagavi =

- village
- Country: India
- State: Karnataka
- District: Mandya

Government
  - Body: Gram panchayat

Languages
  - Official: Kannada
- Time zone: UTC+5:30 (IST)
- Postal code: 571425
- Nearest city: Mandya
- Civic agency: Village Panchayat

Hosagavi is a village in the Mandya district in the southern Indian state of Karnataka. It lies 28 kilometers northwest of Maddur and 2.5 kilometers northwest of Abalavadi. It has the Grama Panchayath office, which constitutes 5 Villages Hosagavi, Chikkahosagavi, D Malligere, Somanahalli and Kumbarakopplu.

The village comprises roughly 496 families and is governed by an elected head, known as the Sarpanch, with elections held every five years. The 2011 Census data indicates that the village's population is 2,331.

According to a journal, Hosagavi has a historical significance due to the presence of inscribed, hero, memorial stones and a temple dating back to the medieval and late medieval periods.

According to a study conducted in 2010, Hosagavi experiences issues in the functioning of its Grama Sabhas. In these assemblies, there is a prevalent perception of casteism, partiality and nepotism in the selection of beneficiaries for various government schemes. The elite and influential community members, often referred to as "big-wigs", are reported to dominate the decision making processes.

== Education ==
GHS Hosagavi is a government high school established in 1984, located in the rural area of Hosagavi village within the Maddur block of Mandya district, Karnataka, India. The school is managed by the Department of Education and offers education for students from grades 8 to 10. It operates as a co-educational institution and conducts classes in the Kannada language.
