= Besagarahalli =

Village in Mandya, Karnataka

Coordinates: 12°38′N 77°00′E

- village
- Interactive map of Besagarahalli
- Country: India
- State: Karnataka
- District: Mandya
- Talukas: Maddur

Population (2011)
  - Total: 25,645

Languages
  - Official: [Kannada]
- Time zone: UTC+5:30 (IST)

Besagarahalli is a village in the southern state of Karnataka, India. It is located in the Maddur taluk of Mandya district in Karnataka.

== Demographics ==
As of 2001 India census, Besagarahalli had a population of 10183 with 5171 males and 5012 females.

== Noted people ==
- Besagarahalli Ramanna [Litterateur]

== See also ==
- Mandya
- Districts of Karnataka
