= Marasinganahalli =

- Motto: 56ut ttutuj
- Location within Karnataka Location within India
- Coordinates: 12°39′32″N 77°01′34″E
- Country: India
- State: Karnataka
- District: Mandya district
- Town: Maddur
- ISO 3166 code: IN-KA
- Website: karnataka.gov.in

Marasinganahalli is a small village in Maddur, Mandya, Karnataka state, India, with a population of around 1400. It used to be famous for its water, which was claimed to cure breathing problems.
