= Madla (disambiguation) =

Madla is a borough in Stavanger Municipality, Norway.

Madla may also refer to:

== People ==
- Frank L. Madla (1937–2006), a Democratic politician from Texas, United States

== Places ==
- Madla Municipality, a former municipality in Rogaland county, Norway
- Madla (village), a small village in Dudda hobli, Mandya district, in Karnataka state in India

== Other ==
- Cicurina madla, a type of spider
- Madla IL, a sports club from Stavanger, Norway
