= Vaidyanathapura =

Village in Mandya, Karnataka, India

Coordinates: 12.585°N 77.047°E

Vaidyanathapura is a village situated 2 kilometres (1.2 mi) from Maddur in the Mandya district of Karnataka, India. The Vaidyanatheswara temple is located in Vaidyanathapura, and the village is situated on the banks of the Shimsha River, a tributary of the Kaveri river.

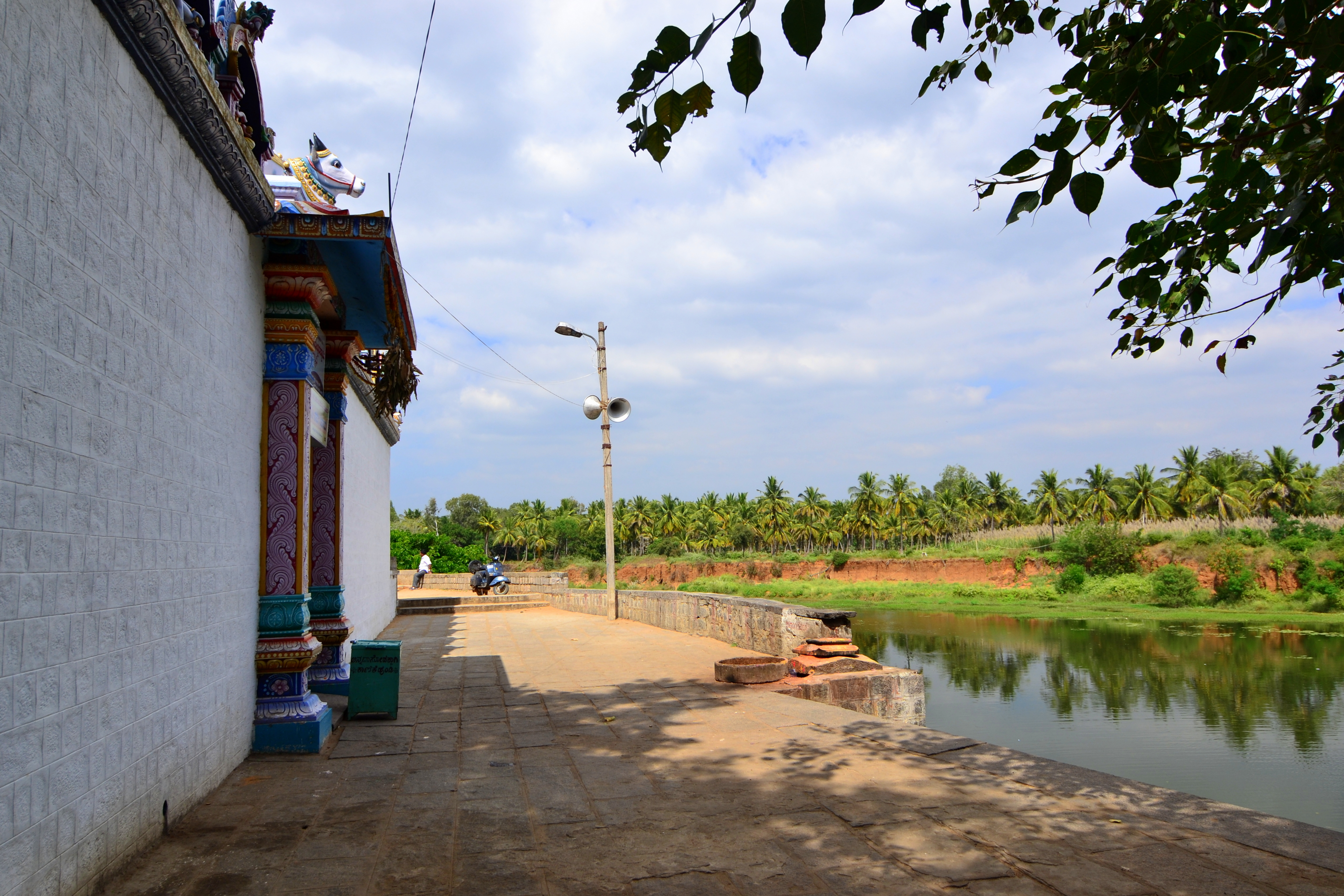
River Side Entrance of the Vaidyanatheshwara Temple

This was one of the first villages in the district get electric lights. mr.N P Lingegowda the then Patel of nagarakere village is the man behind, bringing electricity and bitumen roads in those days by bringing the importance of the temple to the notice of his Highness's jayachamarajendra vodeyar. Then Dewan of Mysore Sri M Mirza Ismil visited this temple in 1941 and helped in carrying out development work in the banks of river shimsha at the foot of the temple entrance.

== Vaidyanatheswara temple ==
This temple is managed by the Deekshit family from time immemorial. The present Archak Radhakrishna Deekshit assisted by his son Shanmukhasundara Deekshit. Earlier, the temple was managed by Shri Subbakrishna Deekshit (brother of Radhakrisha Deekshit)and his uncle Shri Shankara Deekshit before that his brothers Shri Nanjudha Deekshit and Shri Sundra Deekshit was managing the temple with high Shiva-Agama tradition. During the early part of 19th century his father Shri Subbha Deekshit managed the temple.

Being a temple held with great reverence and faith among the Hindu population, and despite holding a pristine history of uncounted ancience, the main deity lord Vaidyanatheshwara is swaysmbhu lingam. The main presiding deity is srivaidynatheshwara, belief is main protector of temple and devotees is the Serpent residing in the temple always, which is safeguarding every devotee coming to temple with good faith and noble devotion. Legend says that the ruling deity has cured multiple illnesses and a great solace to his devotees and has been keeping them safe and happy.

Especially panchamrutha abhishekam will be performed twice a day, priests perform abhishekam with wet clothes as per Agama procedures.

Many emperors visited the temple referring to inscriptions period of Raja Raja Chola, Gangarajas, hoysala Vishnuvarshana the 2nd Krishnadevaraya.

== Gallery ==
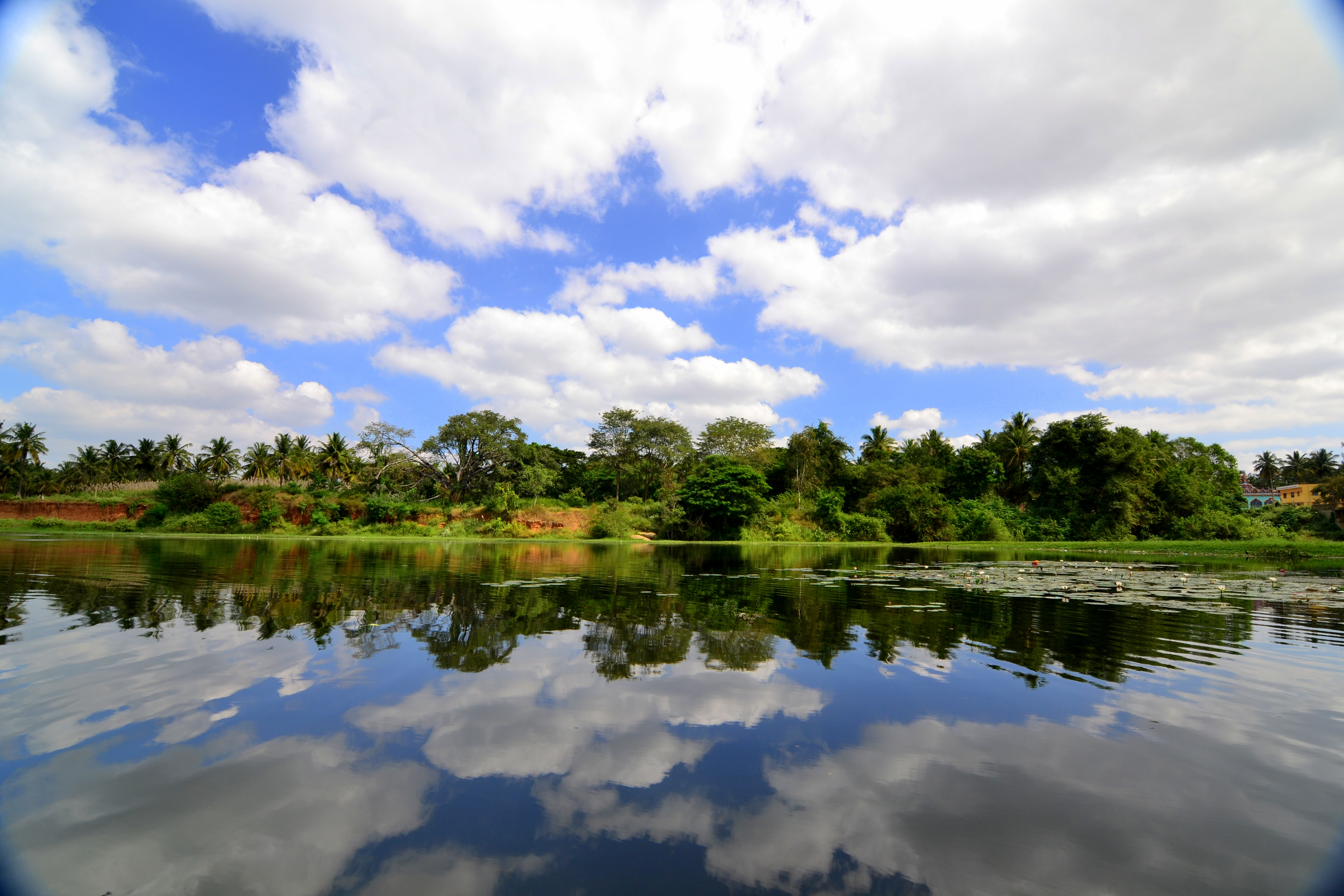
Bank of Shimsha River as seen from Vaidyanatheshwara Temple

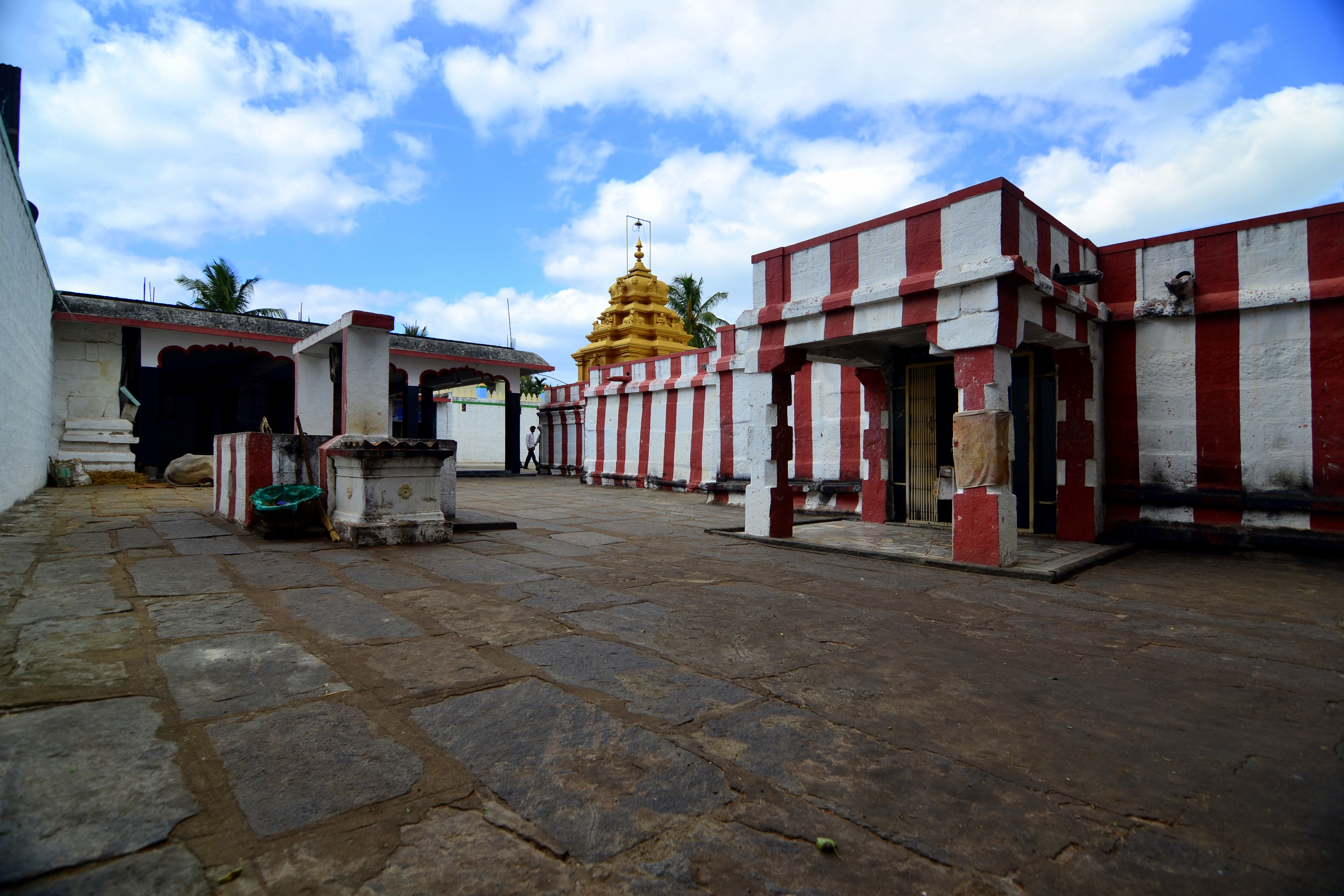
A view of Vaidyanatheshwara Temple

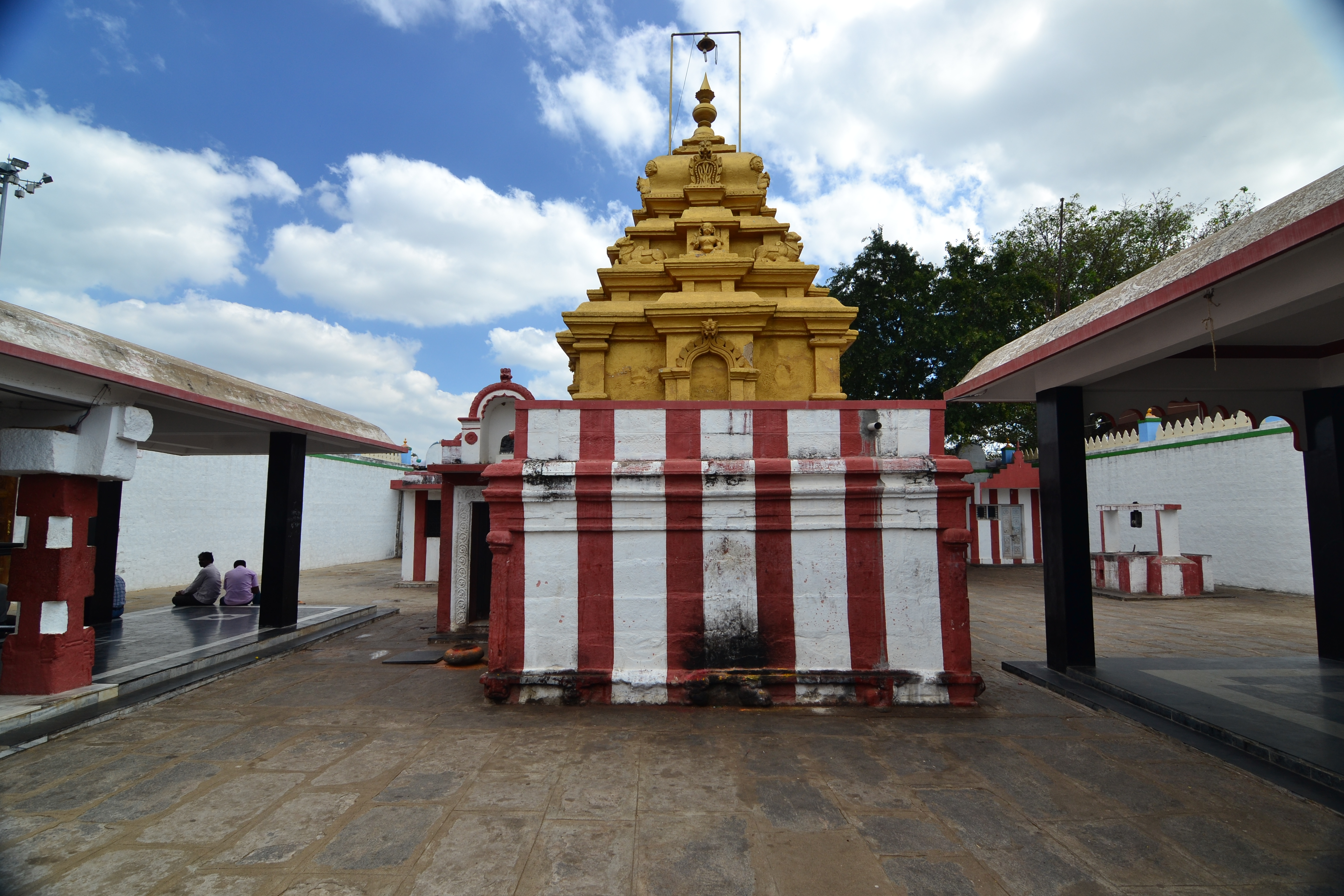
Rear view of the Vaidyanatheshwara Temple

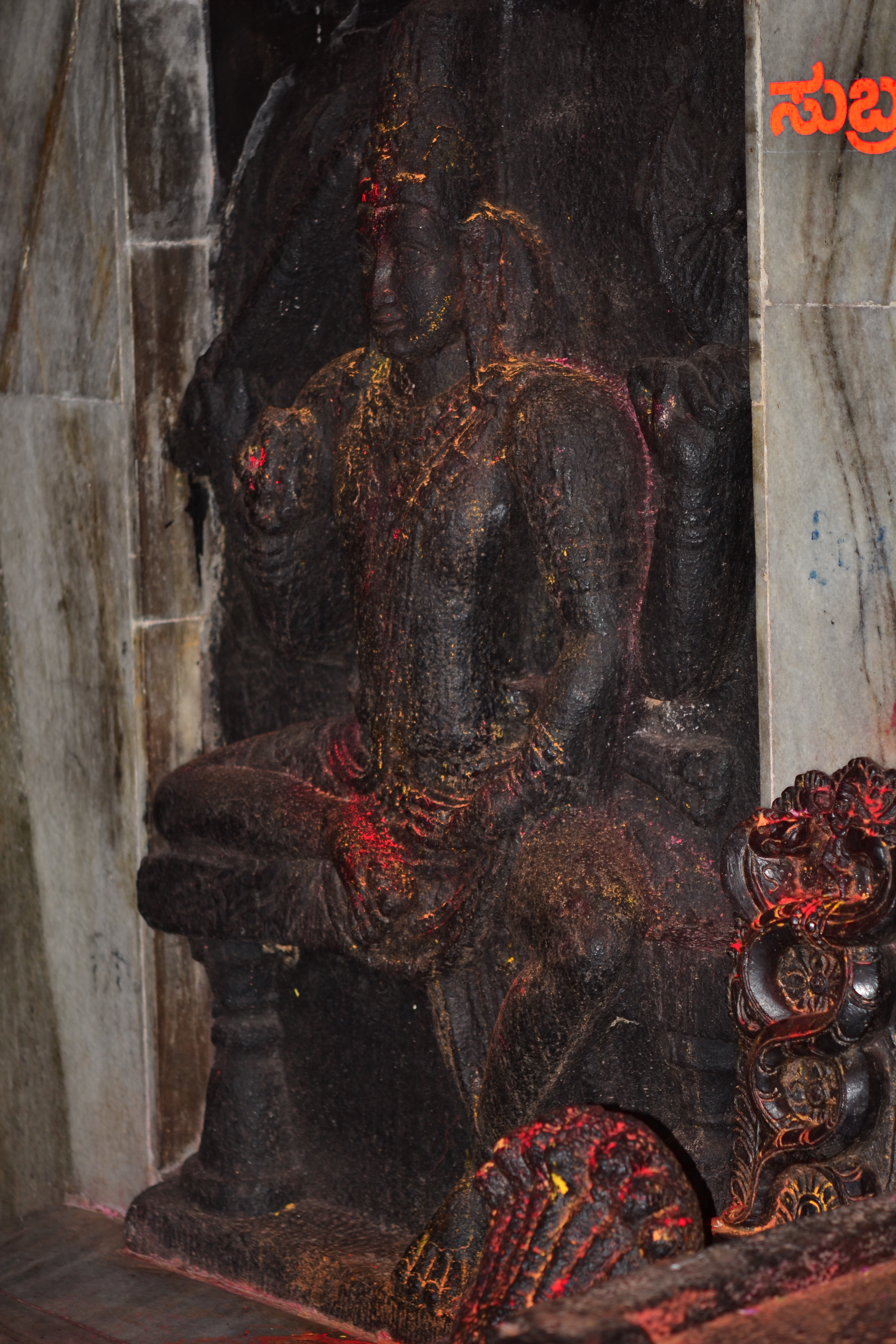
Parshuram Idol inside Vaidyanatheshwara Temple

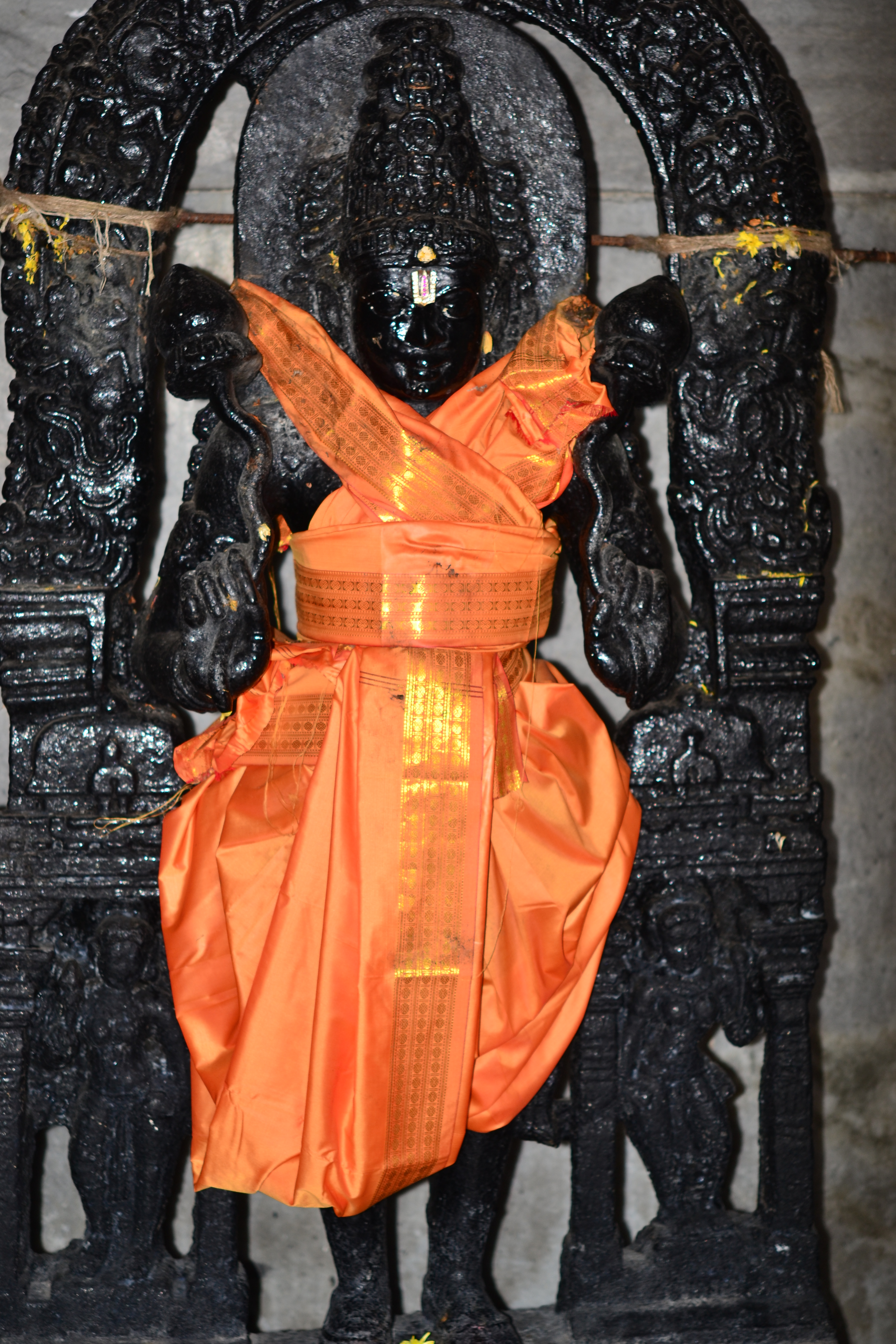
Surya Narayana Statue at Vaidyanatheshwara Temple
