= Abalavadi =

- village
- Location in Karnataka, India Abalavadi (India)
- Coordinates: 12.719630°N 76.940790°E
- Country: India
- State: Karnataka
- District: Mandya
- Talukas: Maddur

Government
  - Body: Village Panchayat

Languages
  - Official: Kannada
- Time zone: UTC+5:30 (IST)
- Postal code: 571425
- Nearest city: Mandya
- Civic agency: Village Panchayat

Abalavadi is a village in the southern state of Karnataka, India. It is located in the Maddur taluk of Mandya district in Karnataka. Thopina Thimmappa Temple is very famous and every year in July the festival of Thopina Thimmappa Hariseve is done by all the people in the village and as well as other Village people also doing hariseve in the same mannar. Prasada of Thimmappa temple is served with lotus leaves. It is a famous festival.

== See also ==
- Mandya
- Districts of Karnataka
