= Dodda Jakkana Halli =

Coordinates: 12.8903°N 76.8548°E

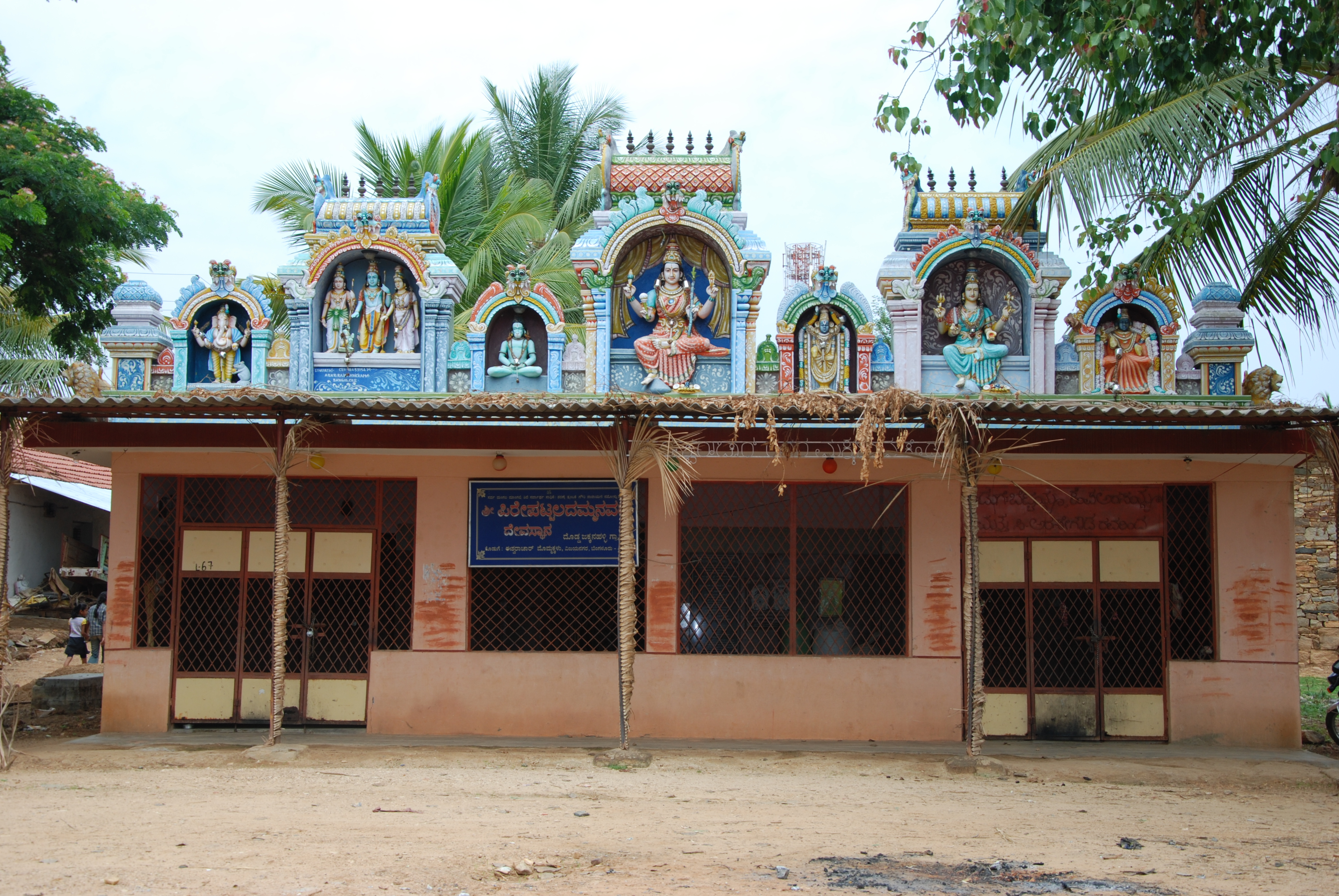

Dodda Jakkanahalli is a village in the southern state of Karnataka, India. It is located in the Nagamangala taluk of Mandya district in Karnataka.

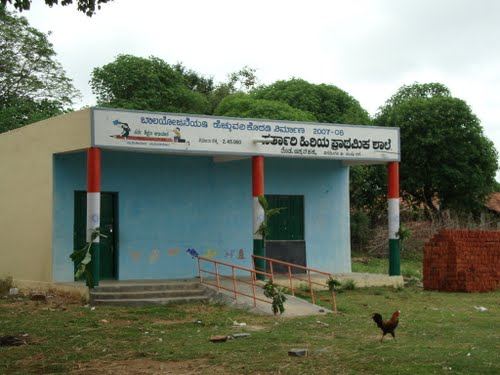
Govt primary school

In 2011, 65 families lived in Dodda Jakkana Halli. The main source of income is through agriculture and dairy farming. Coconuts and vegetables are shipped from this village to Bangalore and Mysore.

Institutions within the village include the milk dairy, Anganwadi, veterinary hospital, Library and Government Primary School.

Cricket is a popular sport in the village.

The village Dodda Jakkana Halli is also known for its temples. The Padaladhamma Temple and the shani mahatma temples are popular in the region. There is also an Anjaneya temple and Maramma temple in the village.

The main icon of the village is Govina Katte which is located entrance of the village.
