= Bidarakote =

Bidarakote Bidarkote
- village
- Interactive map of Bidarakote
- Coordinates: 12°50′48.81″N 76°55′44.45″E
- Country: India
- State: Karnataka
- District: Mandya

Languages
  - Official: Kannada
- Time zone: UTC+5:30 (IST)
- Vehicle registration: KA-

Bidarakote is a village in the Mandya district of the Indian state of Karnataka. It is 20 km away from its district headquarters Mandya

Bidarakote was founded before 1300. The statue of Varadaraja swamy at the centre of the village, resembles Udupi Sri Krishna of Udupi. The Sri Someshwara Temple was built by Chola dynasty.

Recently 12 sacred Jyotirlingam were established at Sri Someshwara by Mr Nagaraju.
