= Hatna =

Village in Karnataka, India

Hatna is a village in the southern state of Karnataka, India, located in the Mandya district.
