= Chikbilti =

- village
- Country: India
- State: Karnataka

Area
  - Total: 1.5 km^{2} (0.58 sq mi)

Population
  - Total: 1,200
  - Density: 800/km^{2} (2,100/sq mi)

Languages
  - pure kannadaOfficial: Kannada
- Time zone: UTC+5:30 (IST)

Chikbilti is a village in the state of Karnataka, India. One of the unique things of this small town is that half of it is in Hassan District and other half is in Mandya District.
