= Ajjahalli, Maddur =

Ajjahalli
- village
- Ajjahalli, Maddur is in Mandya district
- Country: India
- State: Karnataka
- District: Mandya
- Talukas: Maddur

Government
  - Body: Village Panchayat

Languages
  - Official: Kannada
- Time zone: UTC+5:30 (IST)
- Nearest city: Mandya
- Civic agency: Village Panchayat

Ajjahalli, Maddur is a village in the southern state of Karnataka, India. It is located in the Maddur taluk of Mandya district in Karnataka.

== See also ==
- Mandya
- Districts of Karnataka
- Maddur Taluk, Malagaranahally post
- Ajjahally
