= Shivapura =

Village in Karnataka state, India

Coordinates: 12.824083°N 77.046309°E

Shivapura is a small village next to Maddur in Mandya district of Karnataka state, India.

== Demographics ==
As per the 2011 census, Shivapura village has 1,628 people in it.

== Connectivity ==
There is a post office in Shivapura and the PIN code is 571429. Shivapura is connected with Road and Rail network, it is adjacent to the Bangalore-Mysore state highway and it is near the Maddur Railway Station. KSRTC buses plying on the Mysore-Bangalore highway give stop at Shivapur.

== Location ==
Shivapura is located five kilometers north of Maddur town on the bank of Shimsha river. Shivapura is part of Maddur taluk in Mandya district.

== History ==
In 1938, Shivapura village attracted national attention when a call for freedom was initiated by hoisting a national flag in the village. The British administration soon prohibited it and arrested several freedom fighters. This was preceded by an agrarian riot for canal water. 3,000 men marched to Bangalore and submitted their complaints to the Dewan of the colonial government.
