= Basavalinganadoddy =

Basavalinganadoddi Kaadudoddi
- village
- Nickname: B.L.Doddi
- Location in Karnataka, India Basavalinganadoddi (India)
- Coordinates: 12.701267411006704°N 77.0461713581551°E
- Country: India
- State: Karnataka
- District: Mandya

Population (2001)
  - Total: 706
  - Density: 375/km^{2} (970/sq mi)

Languages
  - Official: Kannada
- Time zone: UTC+5:30 (IST)
- PIN: 571 476
- Telephone code: 08232
- Vehicle registration: KA-11

Basavalinganadoddi or Basavalinganadoddy, is a village in Mandya district in the Indian state of Karnataka. It lies on the banks of the river Shimsha. It is 1.5 Kilometers away from the village panchayath headquarters of Kesthur. It is 13.5 Kilometers away from Taluk and the nearest city Maddur and 94 kilometers away from the state capital Bangalore (now Bengaluru). Nearest domestic airport is mysore which is 84 kilometers from the village and 128 kilometers from international airport Bengaluru.

Basavalinganadoddi is named after the god Basava (Nandi), who is believed to be the mount (vahana) of Lord Shiva. Nandi Basaveshwara is a famous god here and a Jatra (a kind of festival) is celebrated in this god's name, which is famous by the name Nandi Basaveshwara Jatra, which happens once in a year during Sankranthi. Kaadudoddi is an ancient name for Basavalinganadoddy.

About half of the agricultural land in the village receives assured irrigation from the Krishna Raja Sagara (KRS).

Basavalinganadoddi's neighboring villages are Yadaanahalli in the north, Kesthur in the east and Adaganahalli in the west. The nearest college, hospital, bank and police stations is in Kesthur.

It is well connected to near cities like Maddur and Mandya.

The Bangalore-Mysore expressway is located 12 km away from the village.

== Geography ==
Basavalinganadoddi is located at 12.701267411006704°N 77.0461713581551°E.

== Demographics ==
As of the provisional figures for the 2001 Census of India, Basavalinganadoddy has a population of 706. Males constitute 52% of the population and females 48%.

== Education ==
Basavalinganadoddi has an average literacy rate of 70%, higher than the national average of 59.5%: male literacy is 73%, and female literacy is 63%. This village has 2 schools which teaches from 1st to 4th std.

== Business and economy ==
Basavalinganadoddi is a prominent agricultural village and it is famous for its Paddy, Ragi (Finger Millet), sugar cane & Tender coconut cultivation. Along with agriculture, sericulture is also a source of income to this village. In many agricultural fields in the village mulberry is grown and this is dependent on rains, lake and KRS water supply.
