= Mudagandooru =

- Village
- Location in Karnataka, India Mudagandooru (India)
- Coordinates: 12.55°N 76.97°E
- Country: India
- State: Karnataka
- District: Mandya
- Elevation: 750 m (2,460 ft)

Languages
  - Official: Kannada
- Time zone: UTC+5:30 (IST)
- PIN: 571416
- Telephone code: 08232
- Vehicle registration: KA-11

Mudagandooru is a village in the southern state of Karnataka, India. It is located in the Mandya district in Karnataka.

It is better known as the middle name of Shashank Mudagundoor Suresh.

== See also ==
- Mandya
- Districts of Karnataka
