= Maddur vada =

Savoury fritter-type snack from South India

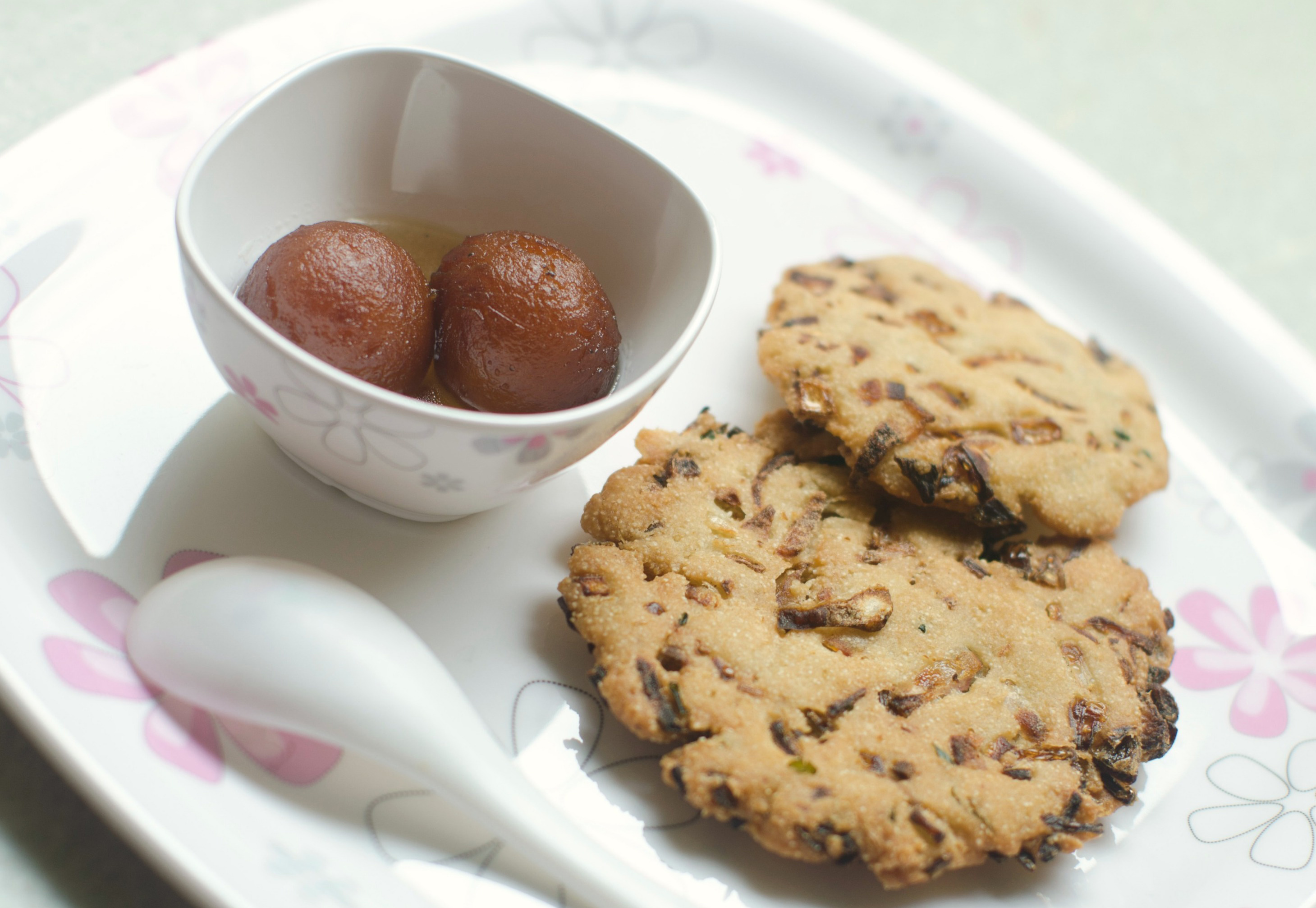
Maddur vada (right) and gulab jamun

Maddur vada, also known as Madduru vade (pronounced "ma-ddur vah-daa", "ma-ddur vah-dey"), is a savoury fritter-type snack from South India. The snack derives its name from the town of Maddur which is in the Mandya district of Karnataka.

== Preparation ==
Maddur vada is made of rice flour, semolina and maida flour mixed with onion, curry leaves, green chillies, grated coconut, cashews / groundnuts, ghee, salt, and asafoetida. The onion and curry leaves are fried and then mixed with water to make a soft dough, which is made into patties and deep fried.

== Origin ==
Maddur Vade, first made in the small railway town of maddur. A Vendor mixed the ingredients on the fly to prepare snacks as a train arrived early, creating this iconic snack. Buy Adukale's Maddur Vade to try them out (not sponsored)

== See also ==
- Cuisine of Karnataka
