= Sathanur, Mandya =

Sathanur is a village in Mandya district, Karnataka, India. Sathanur village is located in the SH-84, just 3 km from Bangalore-Mysore National highway -275.
