= Malavalli Mahadevaswamy =

Indian folk singer

M. Mahadevaswamy
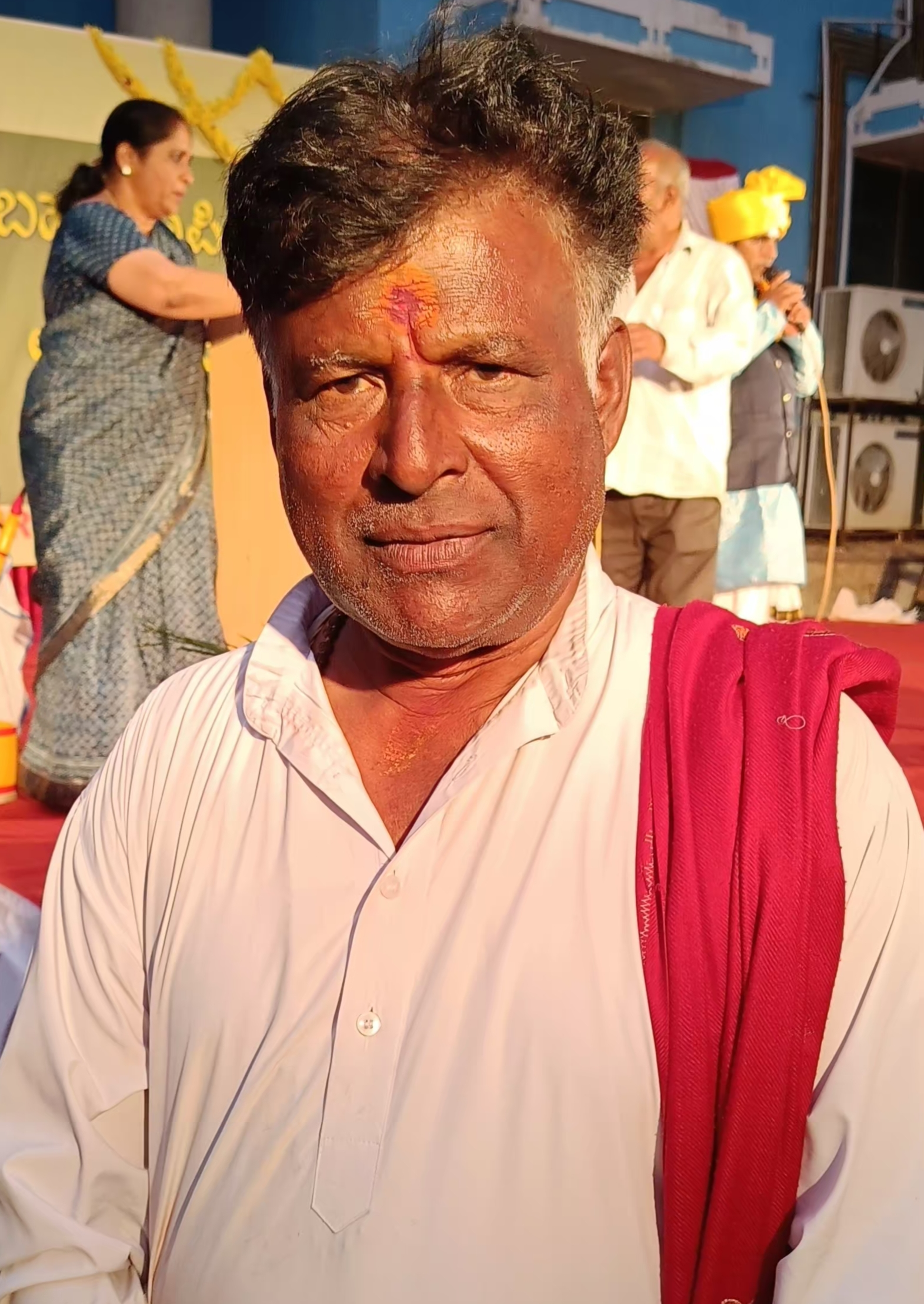
- Mahadevaswamy in Rangayana

Background information
- Born: 16 June 1959 (age 66); Krishnapura, Malavalli, Mandya district, Karnataka, India
- Genres: Folk; Devotional
- Occupations: singer; actor

Krishnapura Madaiah Mahadevaswamy, known as Malavalli Mahadevaswamy, is an Indian folk Kannada singer. He is known for his folk and devotional songs on Manteswamy, Siddappaji and Male Mahadeshwara. He is honoured with the Rajyotsava Prashasti by the Karnataka Government and an Honorary Doctorate from Mysore University.

== Early life ==
Mahadevaswamy was born in a Dalit family in Krishpura village, Malavalli Taluk. His parents were Shehnai Madaiah and Sobane Manchamma. He studied till SSLC.

== Career ==
Mahadevaswamy started singing on Manteswamy, Siddappaji and Male Maadappa which became popular. He belongs to the Neelagara tradition. The most popular is "Maadeshwara Daya Baarade". Later on he recorded songs with S. Janaki, Vani Jairam, Sangeetha Katti, S. P. Balasubrahmanyam, Manjula Gururaj, B. R. Chaya and others.

He acted in the titular role in a film called Siddappajiya Pavadagalu which became popular for its songs.

To date, Mahadevaswamy has recorded more than 1000 songs. He has been singing for 40 years and performing all over the state and abroad.

== Recognition ==
- Rajyotsava Prashasti, second highest civilian award in Karnataka by the Karnataka Government
- Honorary Doctorate from Mysore University

== Songs ==
Devotional songs

- Maadeshwara Daya Baarade
- Yaarige Olideya
- Baduki Uliyuvene
- Navilondu Naliyutide
- Baa Nanna Maadeva
- Hogalaare Halagurige

Folk songs

- O Nanna Chinnave O Nanna Rannave
- Maduvege Baare Thangyamma
- Yalakki Kaayi Tindu
- Bhagyada Balegara
- Anyayakari Brahma e sundarana sanyasi madabhude
