= Madla (village) =

- Village
- Interactive map of Madla
- Coordinates: 12.606°N 76.807°E
- Country: India
- State: Karnataka
- District: Mandya district
- Hobli: Dudda

Madla (Kannada: ಮಾಡಲ) or Madla Ooru is a small village in Dudda hobli, Mandya district, in Karnataka state in India. The village is 13 kilometres (8 mi) from the district centre.
