= Maddur, Mandya =

Maddur
- Town
- Madduru
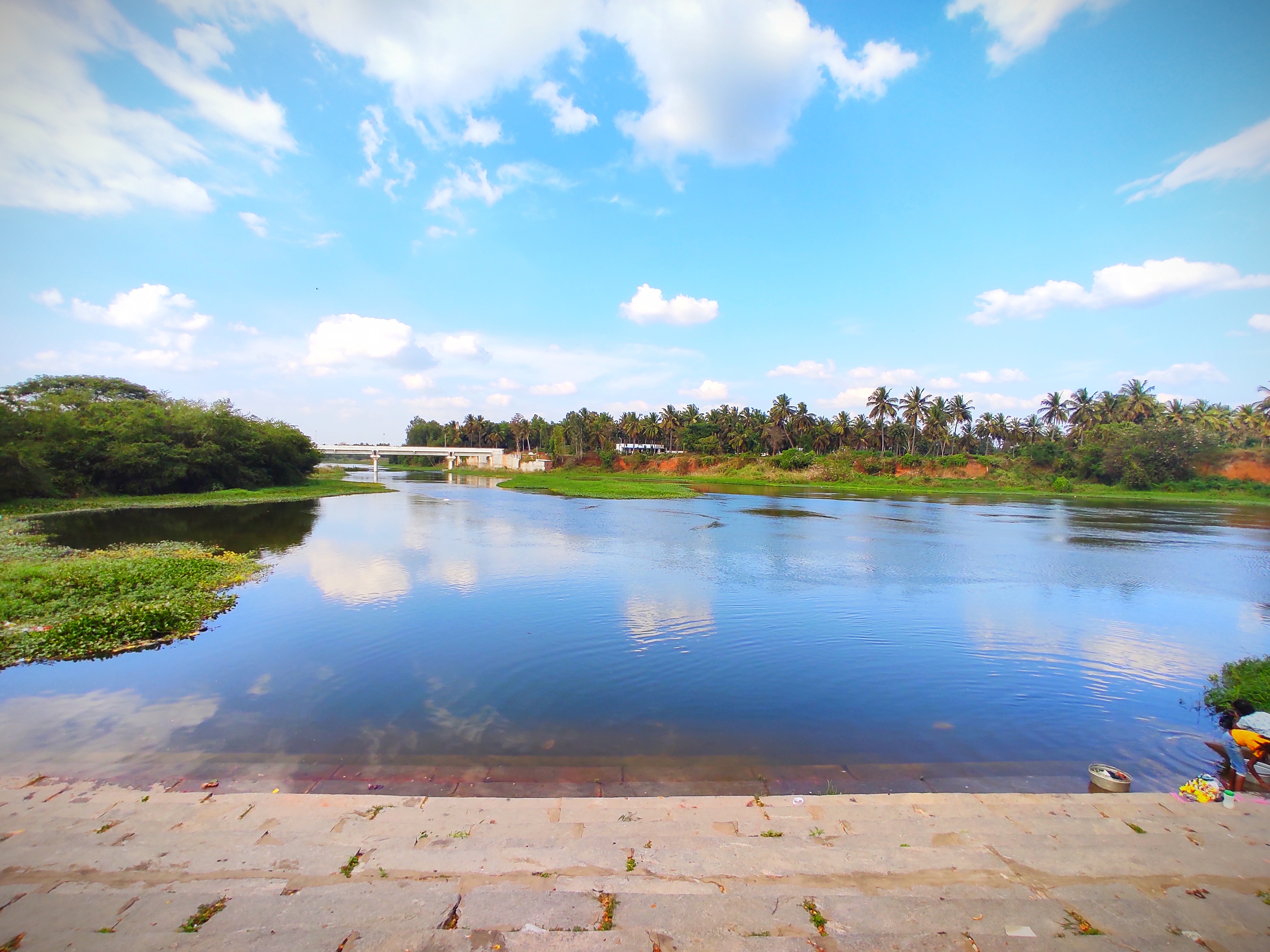
- The Shimsha river in Maddur

- Location in Karnataka, India Maddur (India)
- Coordinates: 12.5849°N 77.05°E
- Country: India
- State: Karnataka
- District: Mandya

Government
  - Body: Town Municipal Council

Area
  - Town: 6.23 km^{2} (2.41 sq mi)
  - Rural: 612 km^{2} (236 sq mi)
- Elevation: 662 m (2,172 ft)

Population (2011)
  - Town: 28,754
  - Density: 4,620/km^{2} (12,000/sq mi)
  - Rural: 266,678
- Demonym: Maddurean

Languages
  - Official: Kannada
- Time zone: UTC+5:30 (IST)
- PIN: 571428
- Telephone code: 08232
- Vehicle registration: KA-11
- Website: http://maddurtown.mrc.gov.in/

Maddur (also pronounced as Maddūru) is one of the taluks of Mandya district in the Indian state of Karnataka. It lies on the banks of the river Shimsha. It is 82 kilometers from the state capital Bangalore and 60 kilometers from Mysore. Madduru derived from Maddu (in Kannada) a term referring to chemicals used for explosives and also for plant based ancient medicine. Maddur vada is a popular cuisine.

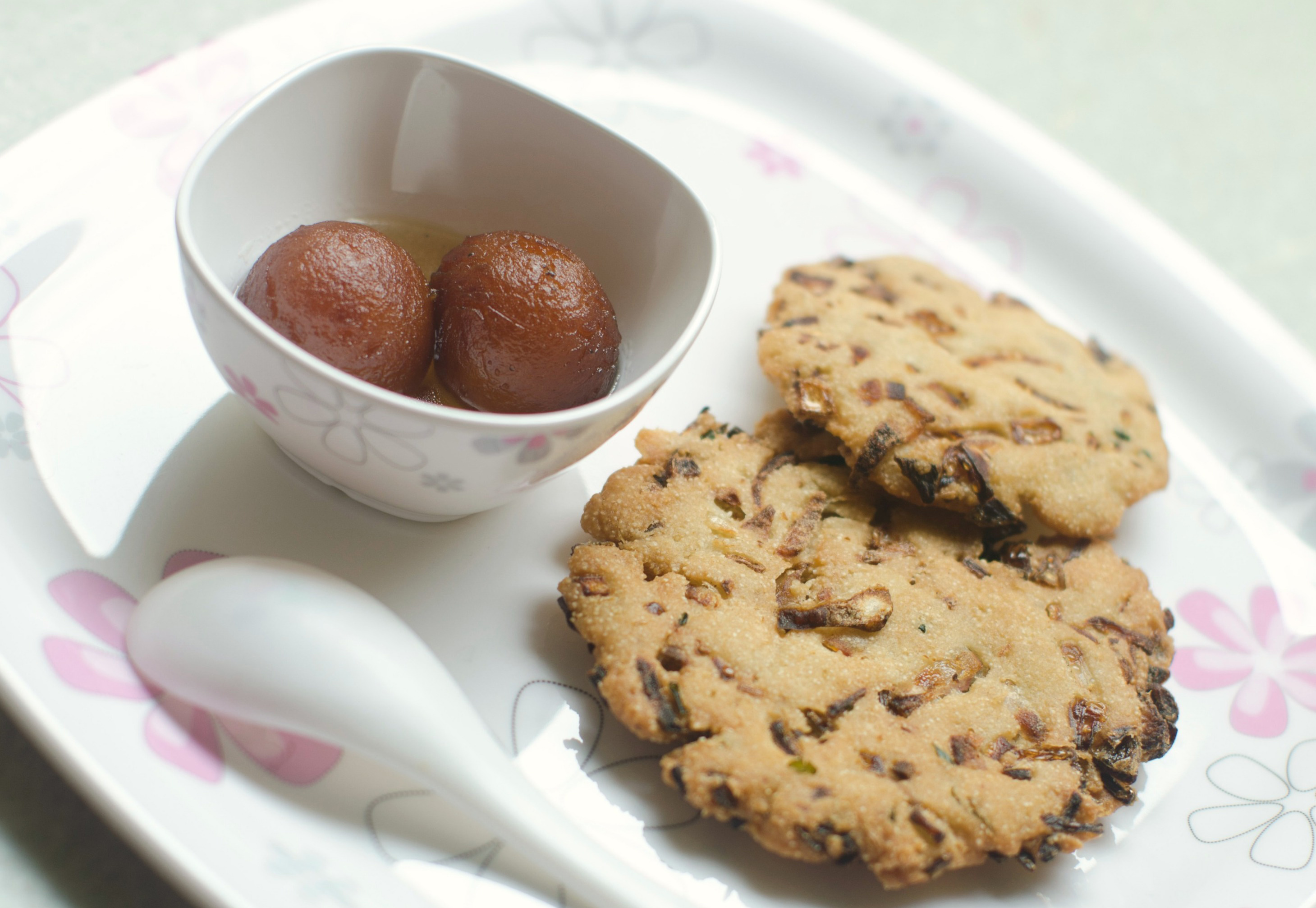
Maddur vada with Gulab jamun

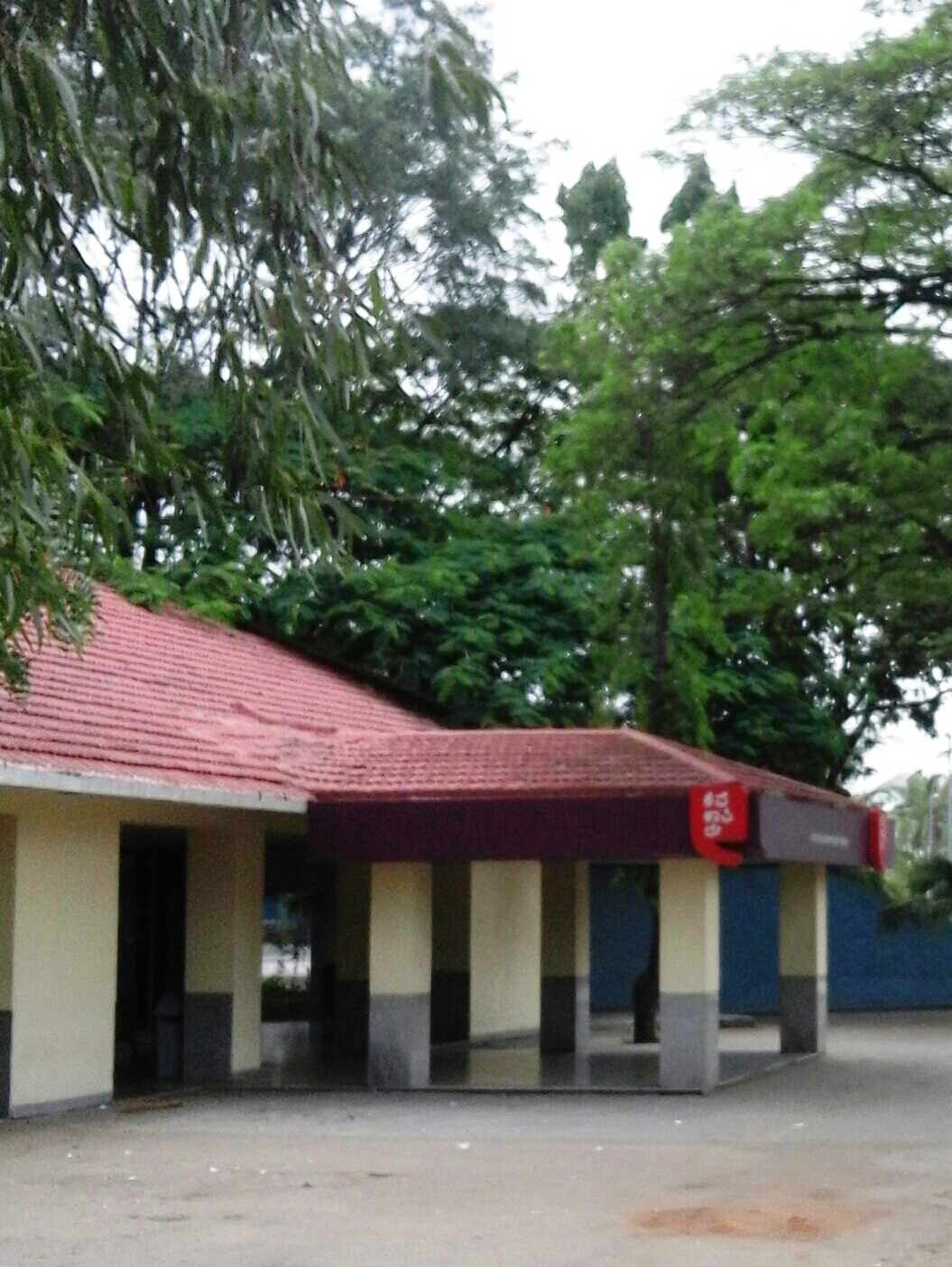
Coffee shop in Maddur

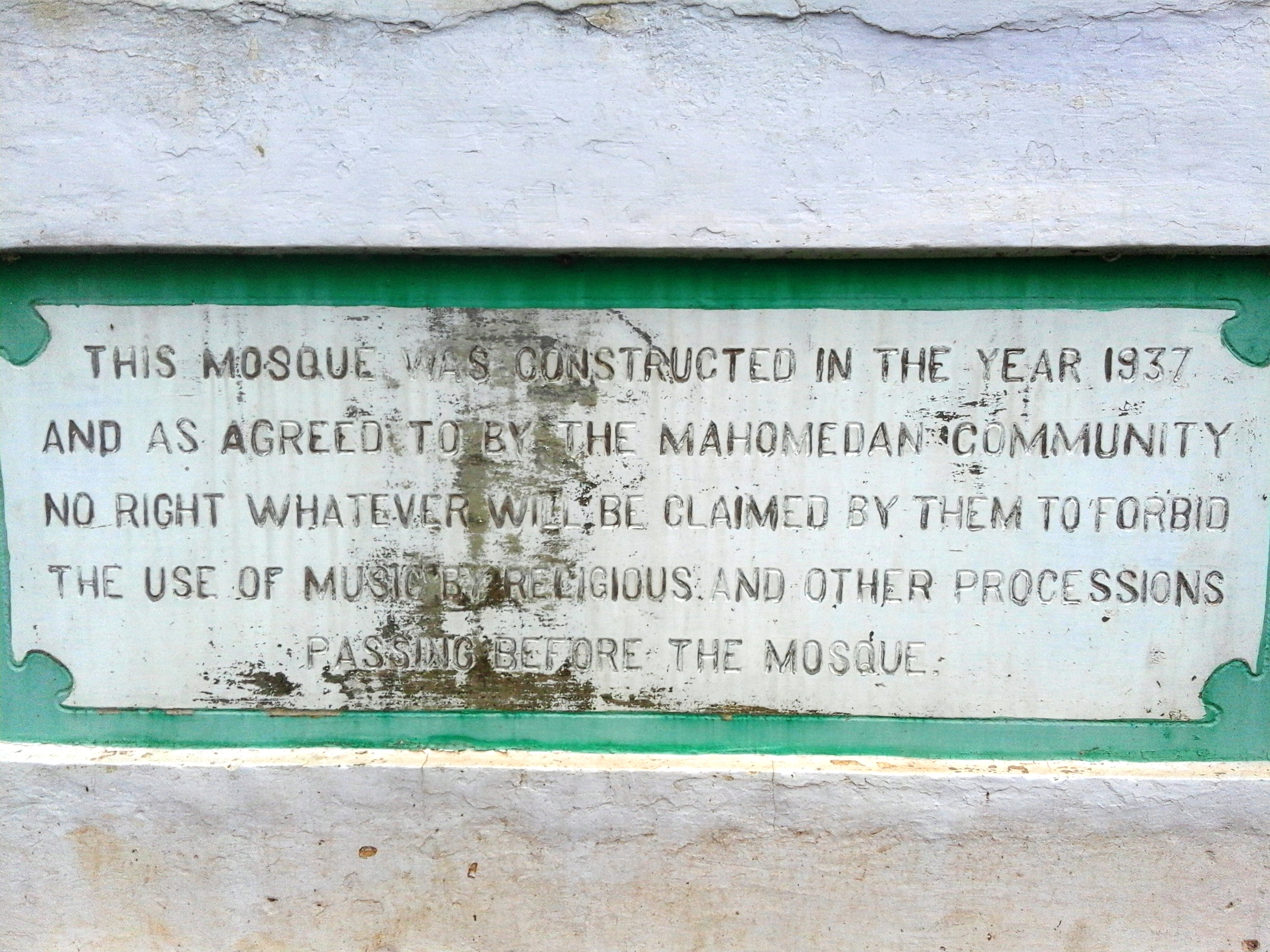
Maddur Mosque

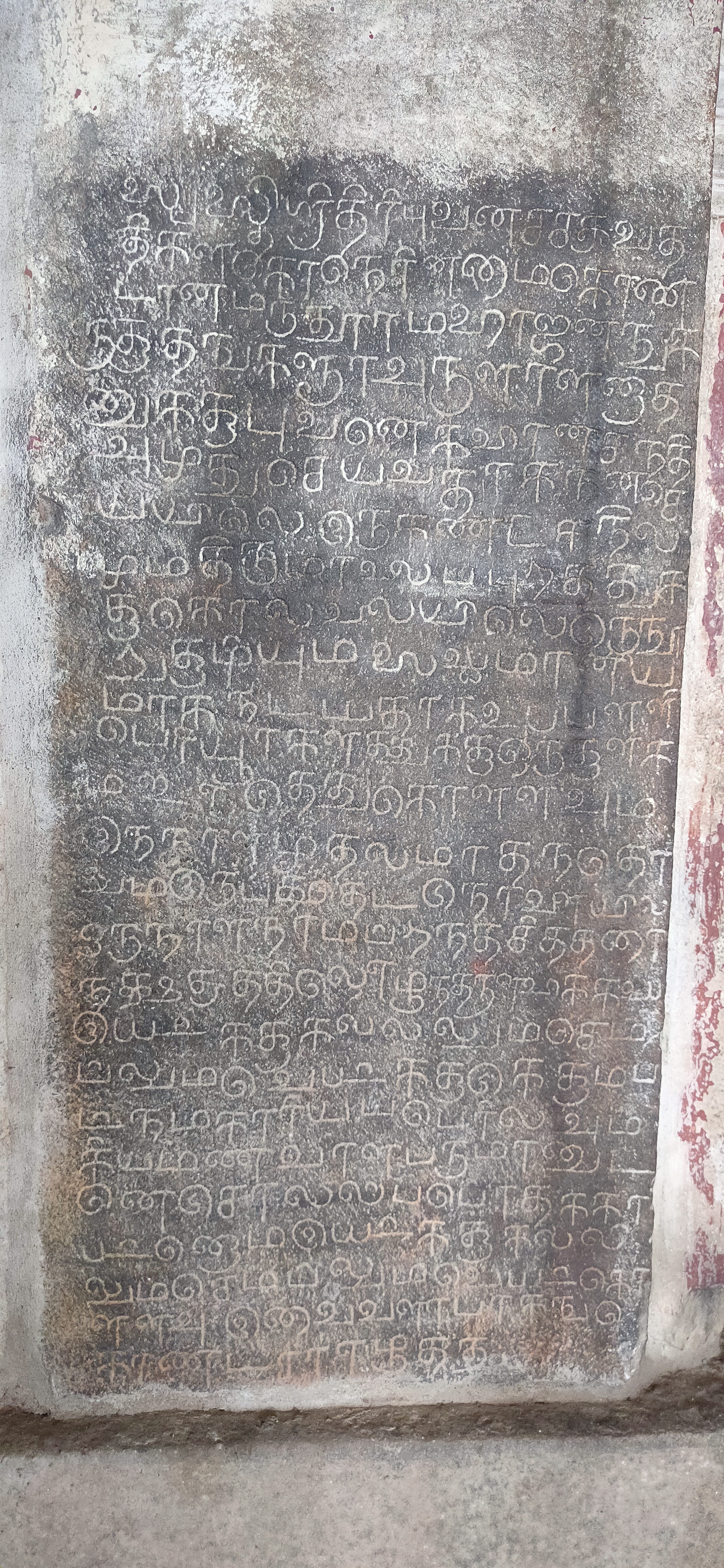
Tamil Inscriptions Found in Ugra Narasimha Swamy Temple, Maddur.

== Geography ==
Maddur is located at 12.584169°N 77.0449°E. It has an average elevation of 662 metres (2175 ft). The Maddur Taluk neighbors Channapatna, Malavalli and Mandya Talukas the most and Nagamangala and Kunigal talukas for some extent.

== Demographics ==
As of 2011 India census, Maddur had a population of 28,754 of which 14,342 males and 14,412 females. Maddur has an average literacy rate of 68%, higher than the national average of 59.5%: male literacy is 73%, and female literacy is 63%. In Maddur, 12% of the population is under 6 years of age.

== Crops ==
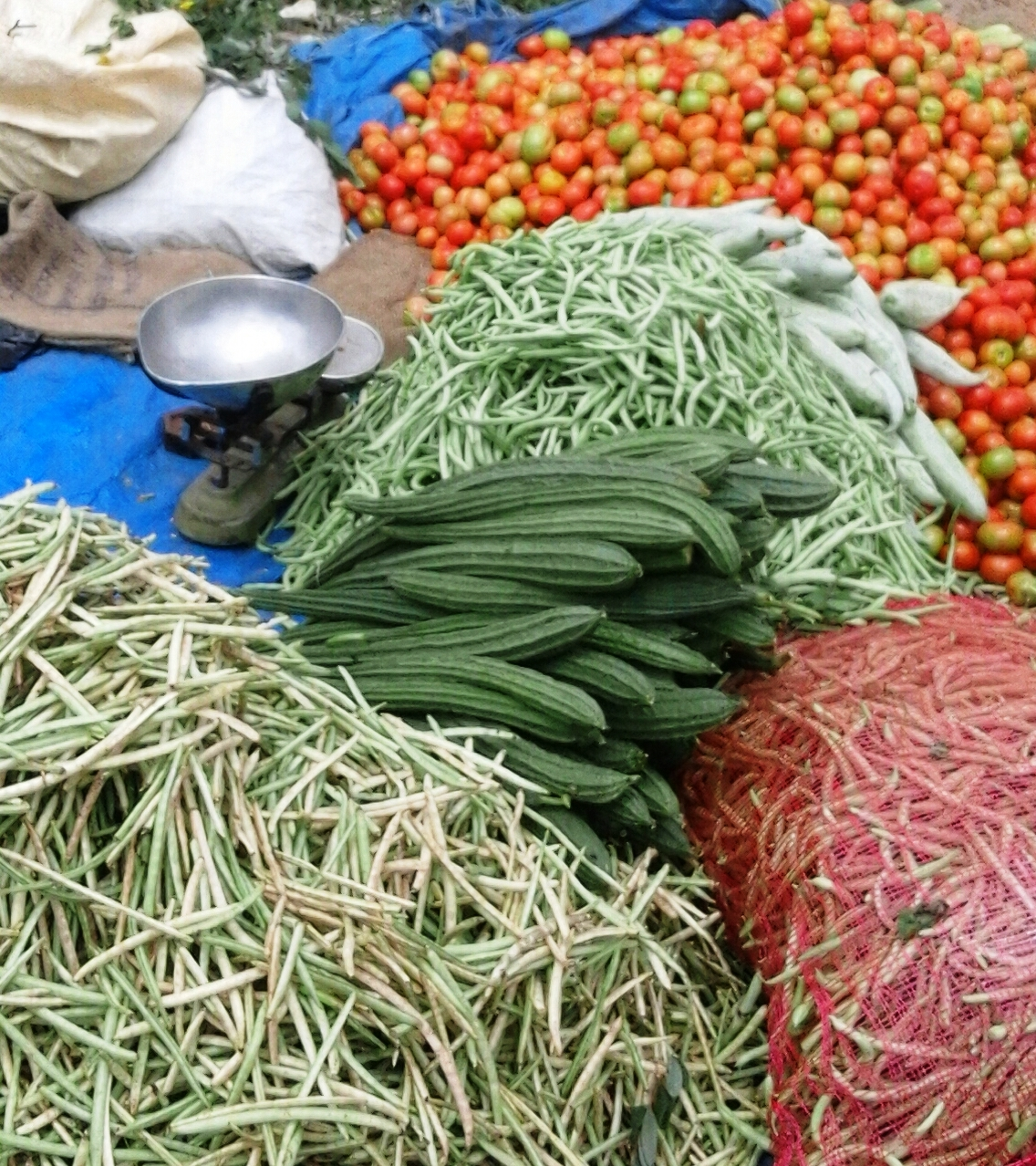
Vegetable shop in Maddur

Maddur has been recently famous for its tender coconut cultivation. Farmers from Maddur, Mandya, Channapatna, Malavalli and surrounding areas sell tender coconuts. Nearly 300 trucks of nuts are daily sent to the other states of India such as Punjab, Maharashtra, West Bengal, Goa, Telangana, Gujarat and other states. Small towns near Maddur consume more and more tender coconuts daily. Maddur has been recently named as Tender coconut capital of India.

== Temples ==
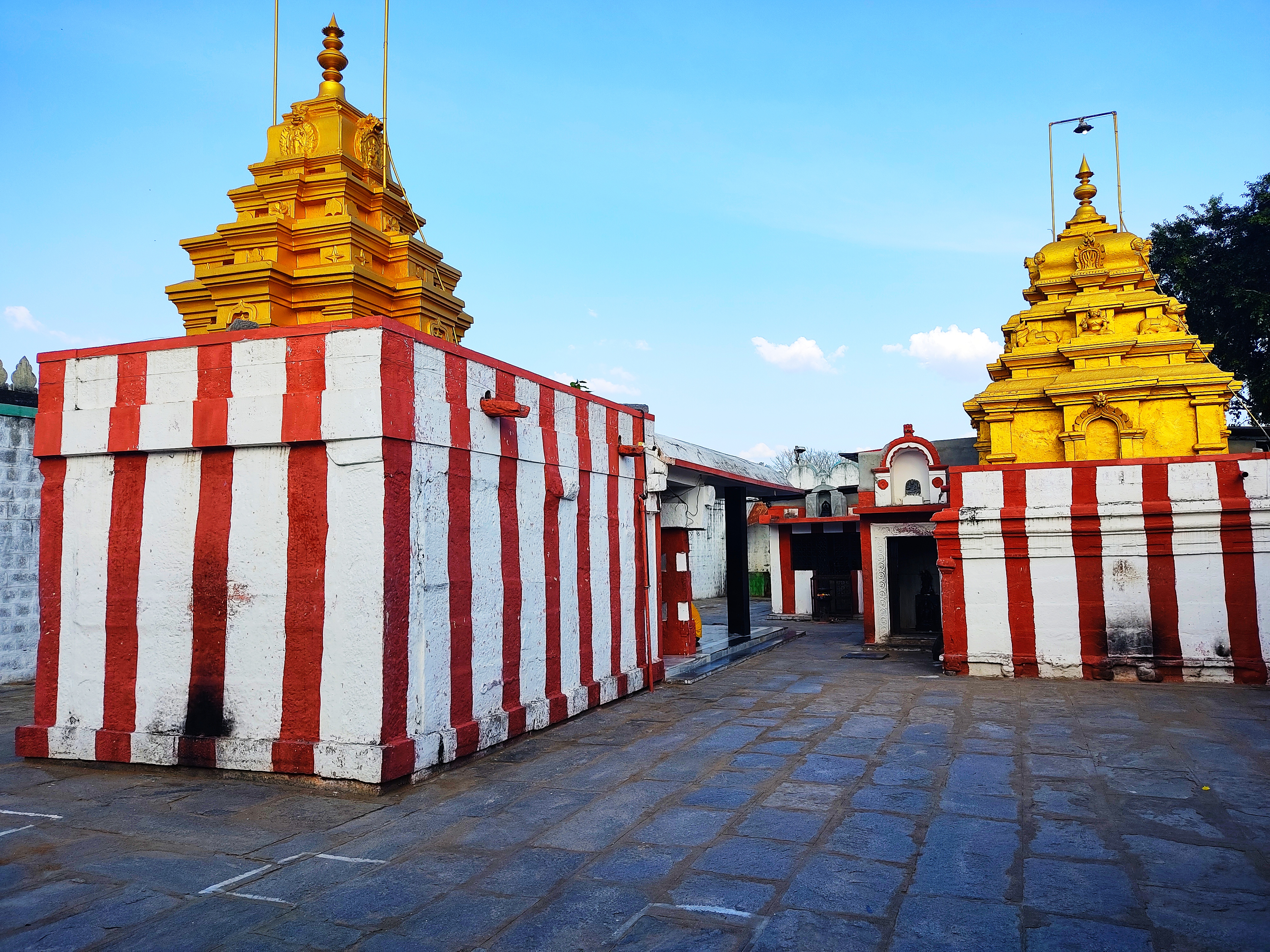
Vaidyanatheshwara temple in Maddur

Among the important temples here is the Narasirnha temple of the Hoysala period with a 7 ft high image of Ugra Narasimha made of black stone.

- Varadarajawamy temple

Maddur's Varadaraja temple is an early Chola or pre-Chola structure. Its 12 ft high Alialanatha deity is elaborately carved both in front and on the back with unusual features which has led to the Kannada saying 'Ella Devara Munde Nodu Allalanathana hinde nodu' - 'All other idols are to be seen from the front but Allalanatha is to be seen from the back'. The temple was built by king Vishnuvardhana (formerly known as Bitti Deva).

- Vaidyanathapura – Vidyanatheswara Temple
- Shivapura - Shivapur in Maddur is famous for the historical monument Satyagraha Soudha the symbolic structure of Maddur where Mahatma Gandhi had sat for Satyagraha against the British along with other freedom fighters. An inspiring monument of India's freedom struggle located adjacent to the Mysuru-Bengaluru highway at Shivapura of Maddur taluk in Mandya District Built to commemorate the Shivapura Flag Satyagraha of 1938.
- Kokkarebellur – Kokkare Bellur, is a famous bird sanctuary located in maddur taluk. Its 12 km from Maddur town.

=== Jain temple ===
A Jain temple or Derasar is the place of worship for Jains, the followers of Jainism. Jain architecture is essentially restricted to temples and monasteries, and secular Jain buildings generally reflect the prevailing style of the place and time they were built.

Jain temple architecture is generally close to Hindu temple architecture, and in ancient times Buddhist architecture. Normally the same builders and carvers worked for all religions, and regional and period styles are generally similar. For over 1,000 years the basic layout of a Hindu or most Jain temples has consisted of a small garbhagriha or sanctuary for the main murti or cult images, over which the high superstructure rises, then one or more larger mandapa halls.

Māru-Gurjara architecture or the "Solanki style" is, a particular temple style from Gujarat and Rajasthan (both regions with a strong Jain presence) that originated in both Hindu and Jain temples around 1000, but became enduringly popular with Jain patrons. It has remained in use, in somewhat modified form, to the present day, indeed also becoming popular again for some Hindu temples in the last century. The style is seen in the groups of pilgrimage temples at Dilwara on Mount Abu, Taranga, Girnar and Palitana.

In 2016, Archaeological Survey of India (ASI) excavated another 13 ft (4.0 m) statue of Bahubali made in the 3rd – 9th centuries on another hillock located opposite the basadis in Arthipura. Excavation work is expected to be completed by 2018.

== See also ==
- Ajjahalli, Maddur
- Halaguru
