= Mandya district =

- District of Karnataka
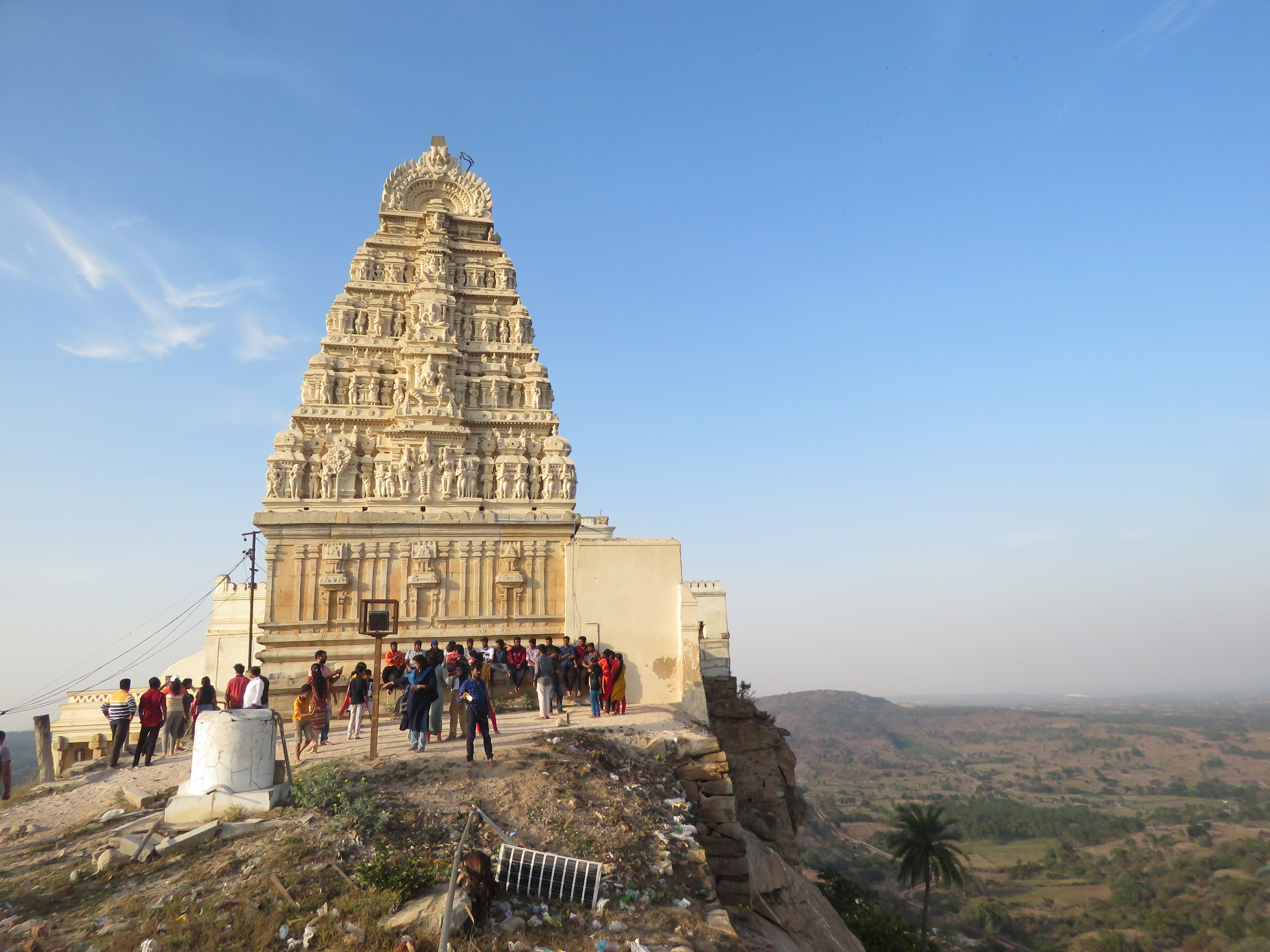
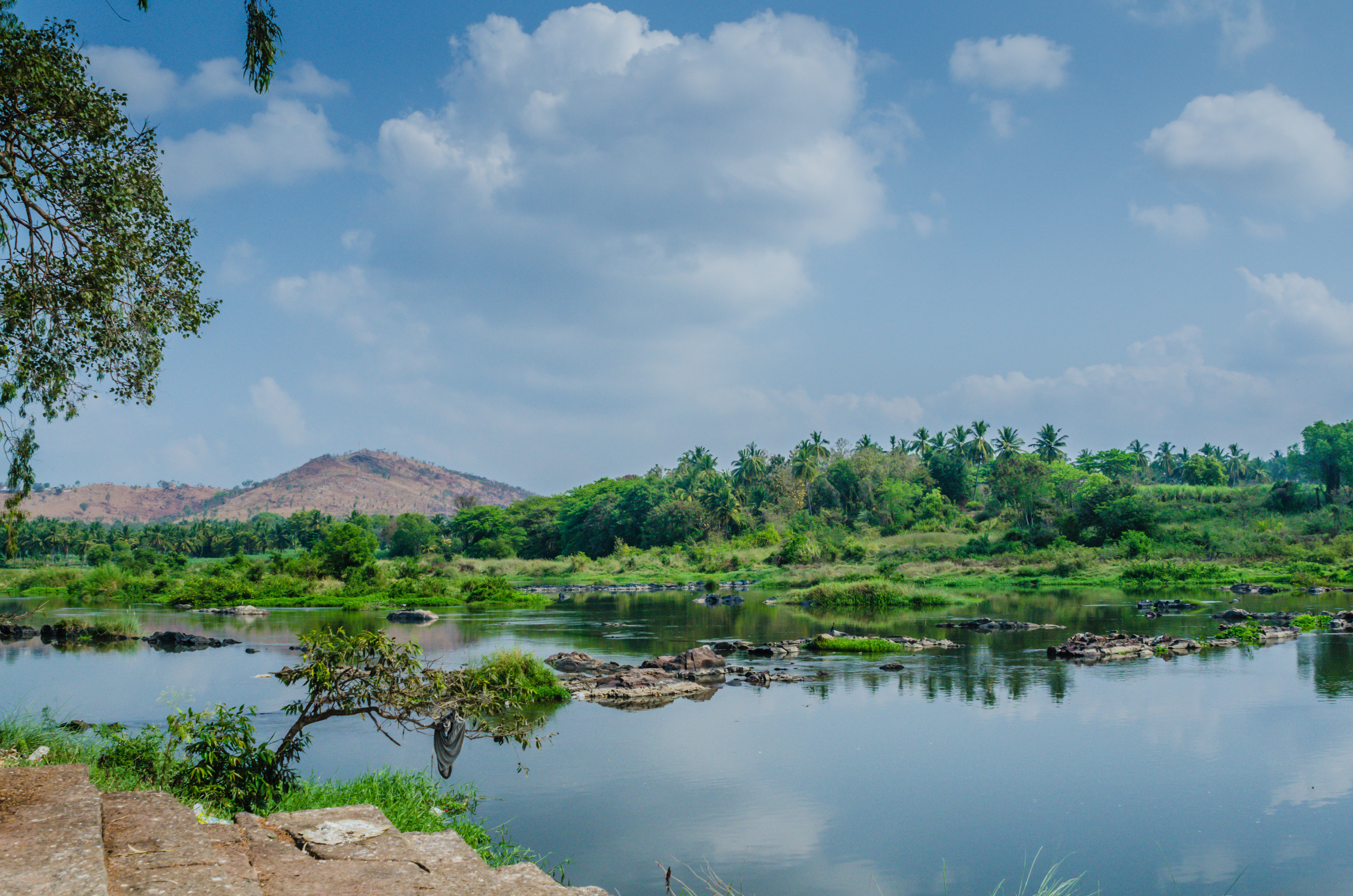
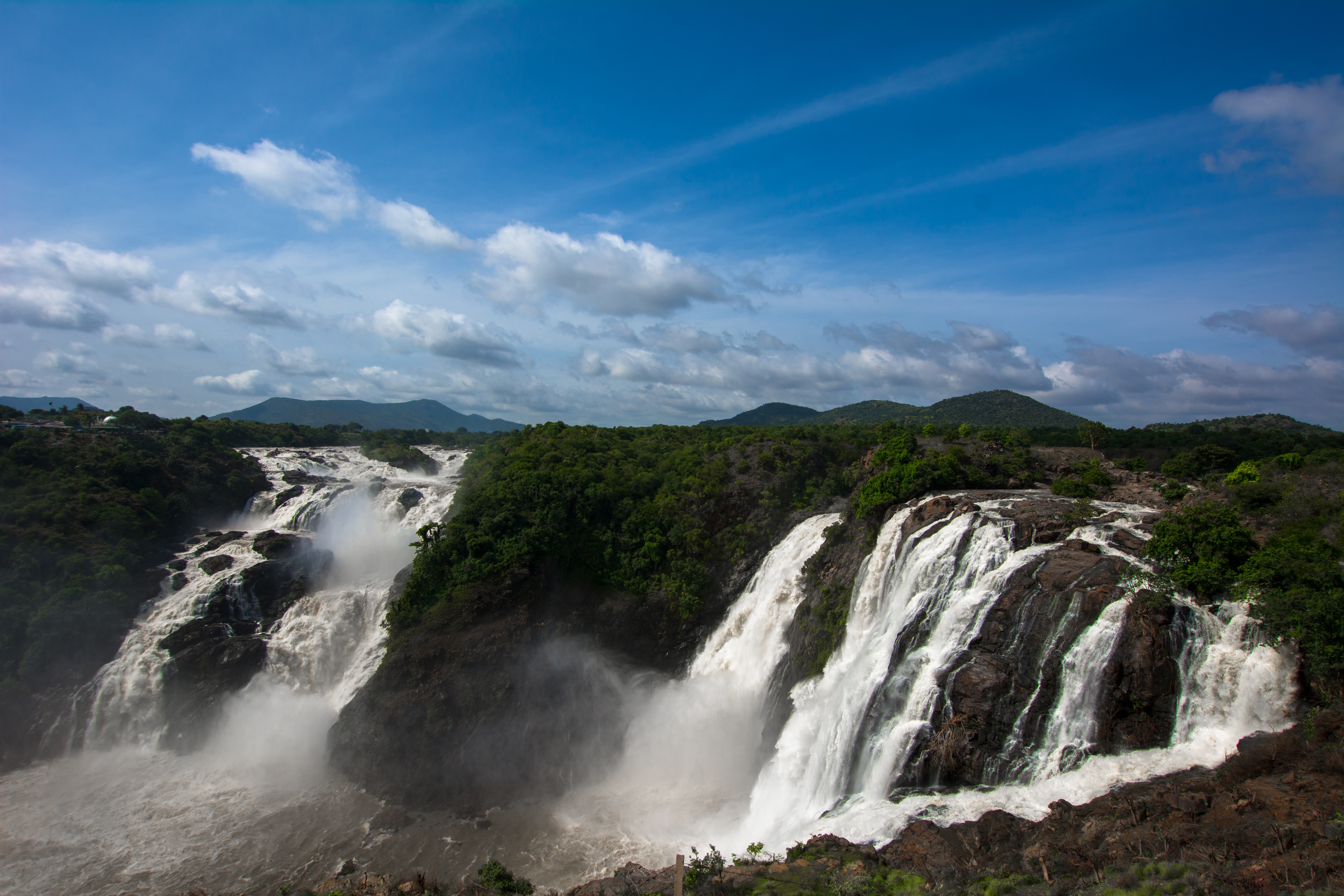
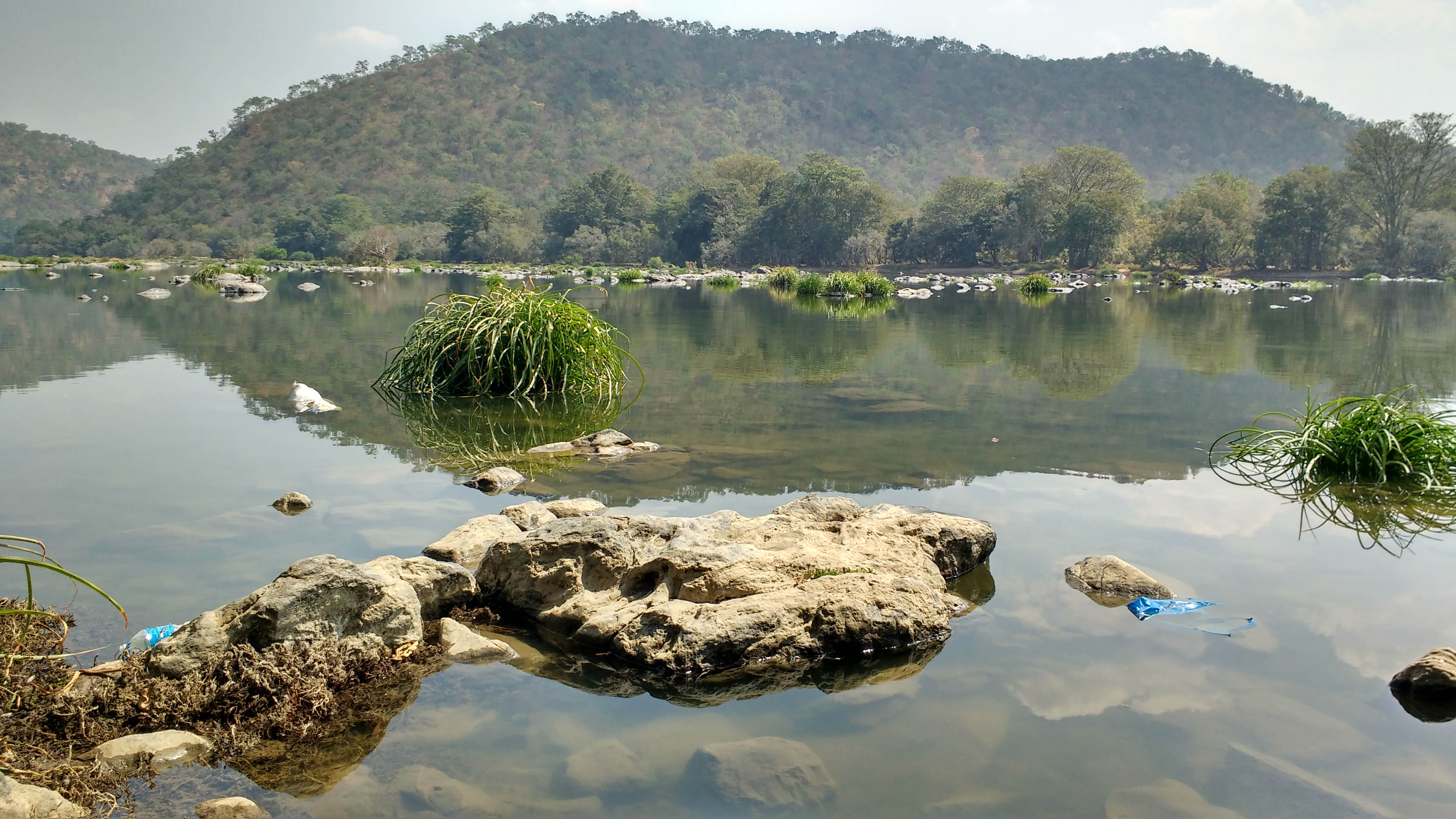
- Yoga Narasimha Temple in Melukote, Shivanasamudra Falls, Bheemeshwari in Kaveri Wildlife Sanctuary, Merger of rivers near Srirangapatna
- Interactive map of Mandya district
- Coordinates: 12.52°N 76.9°E
- Country: India
- State: Karnataka
- Division: Mysore
- Established: 1 July 1939
- Headquarters: Mandya
- Talukas: Mandya; Malavalli; Maddur; Nagamangala; Krishnarajpet; Pandavapura; Srirangapatna

Government
  - Deputy Commissioner: Dr. Kumara (IAS)
  - Superintendent of Police: Mallikarjuna Baladandi (IPS)

Area
  - Total: 4,961 km^{2} (1,915 sq mi)

Population (2011)
  - Total: 1,805,769
  - Density: 364.0/km^{2} (942.7/sq mi)

Languages
  - Official: Kannada
- Time zone: UTC+5:30 (IST)
- ISO 3166 code: IN-KA-MA
- Vehicle registration: KA-11 (Mandya), KA-54 (Nagamangala)
- Sex ratio: 1.015 ♂/♀
- Literacy: 70.40 %
- Lok Sabha constituency: Mandya Lok Sabha constituency
- Climate: Tropical Semi-arid (Köppen)
- Precipitation: 691 millimetres (27.2 in)
- Avg. summer temperature: 35 °C (95 °F)
- Avg. winter temperature: 16 °C (61 °F)
- Website: mandya.nic.in

Mandya district is an administrative district of Karnataka, India. The district Mandya was carved out of larger Mysore district in the year 1939.

Mandya is the main town in Mandya district. As of 2011, the district population was 1,808,680 (of which 16.03% was urban).

== Geography ==
Mandya district is located between north latitude 12°13' to 13°04' N and east longitude 76°19' to 77°20' E. It is bounded by Mysore district to the west and southwest, Tumkur district to the northeast, Chamrajnagar district to the south, Hassan district to the northwest, and Ramanagar district to the east. It has an area of 4,961 square kilometres (1,915 sq mi). The administrative center of Mandya district is Mandya City.

=== Rivers ===
Mandya District has five rivers: Kaveri River and four tributaries main Hemavathi, Shimsha, Lokapavani, Veeravaishnavi.

== Administrative divisions ==
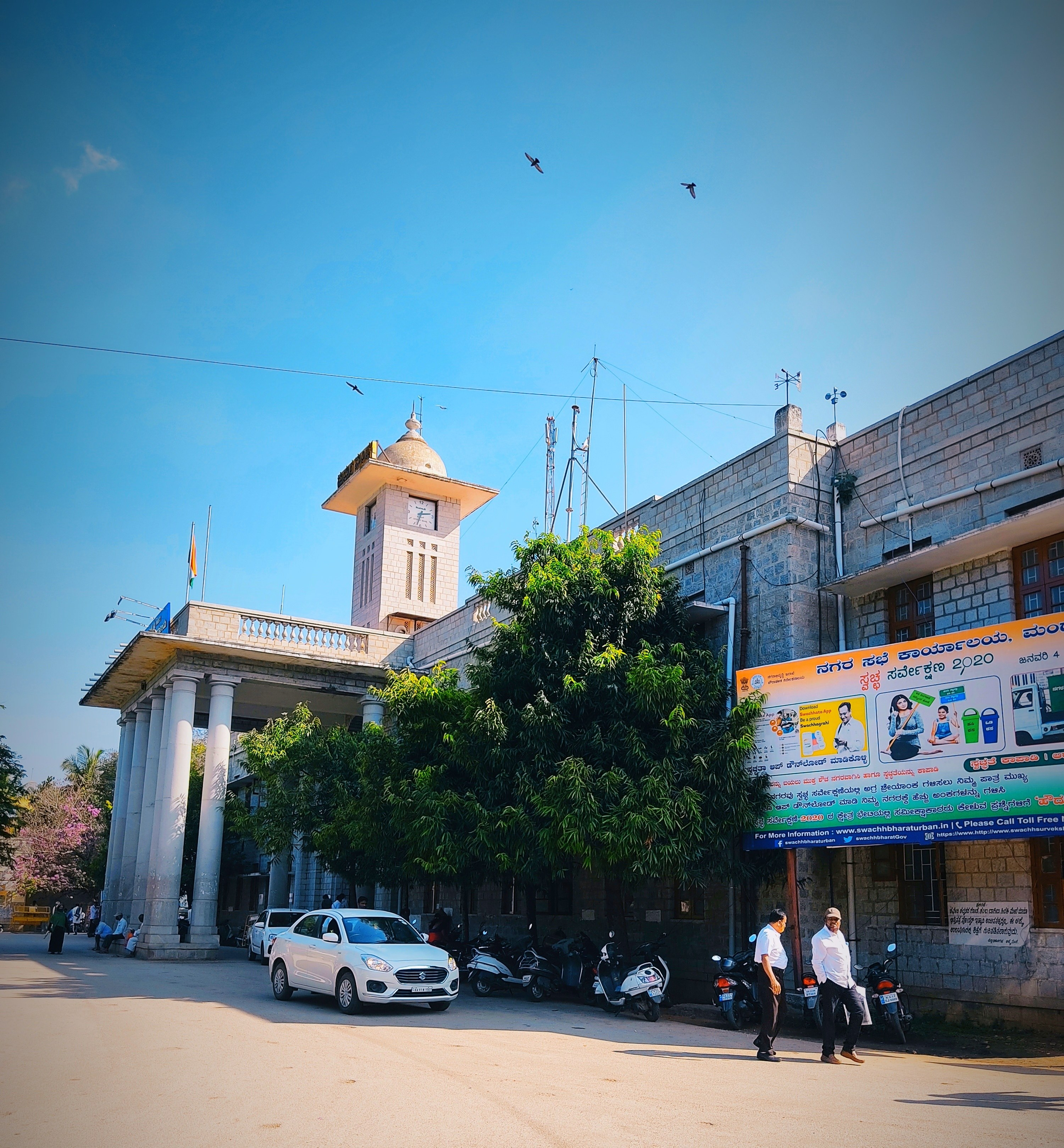
DC office, Mandya

Mandya district consists of 7 taluks grouped under 2 subdivisions. The Mandya subdivision comprises Mandya, Maddur and Malavalli taluks, while the Pandavapura subdivision comprises Pandavapura, Srirangapatna, Nagamangala and Krishnarajpet taluks.

== Economy ==
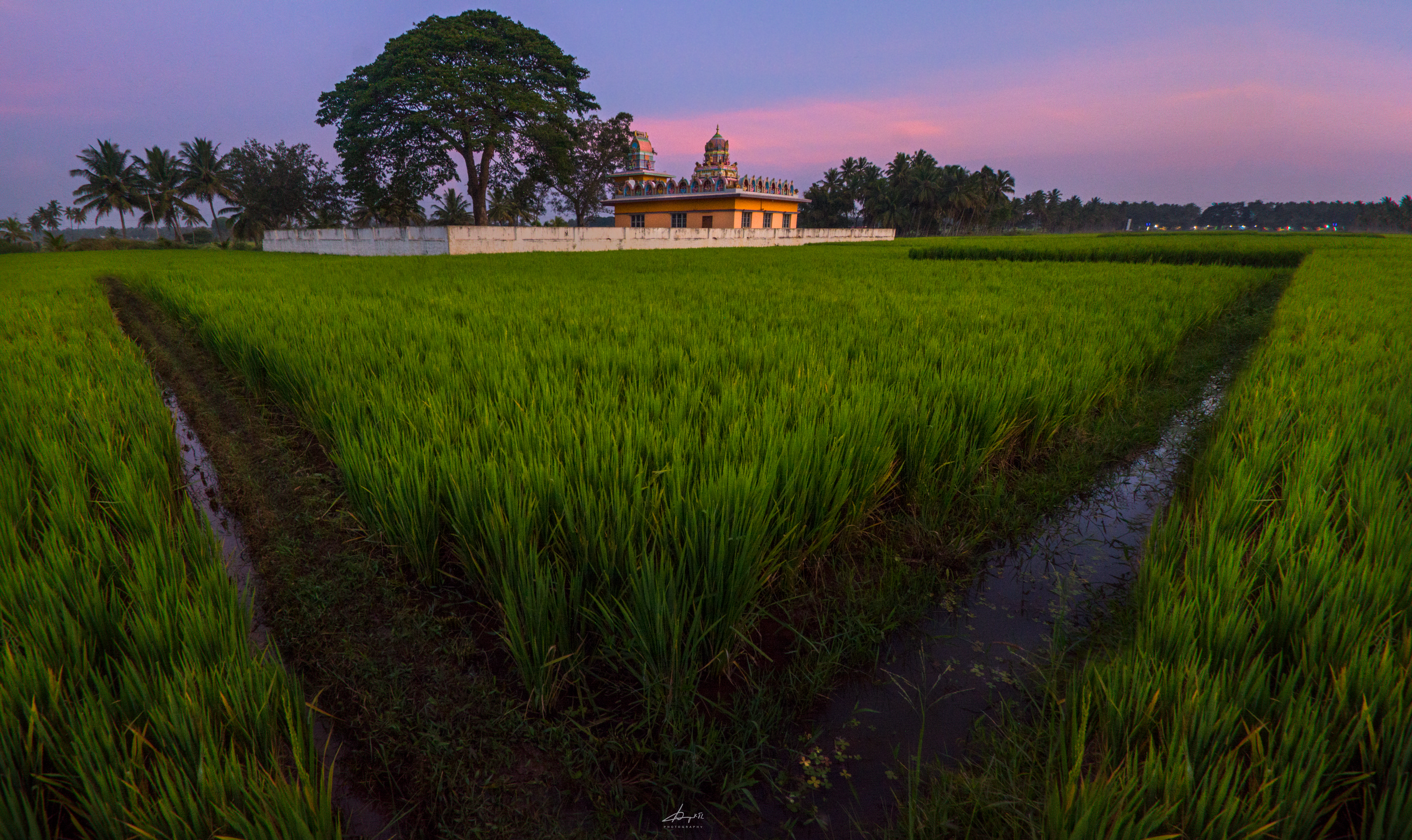
Paddy fields near Srirangapatna

Since Mandya is located on the banks of the river Cauvery, agriculture is the predominant occupation and the single largest contributor to Mandya's economy. The main crops grown are paddy sugarcane, jowar, maize, cotton, banana, ragi, coconut, pulses, and vegetables.

== Transportation ==
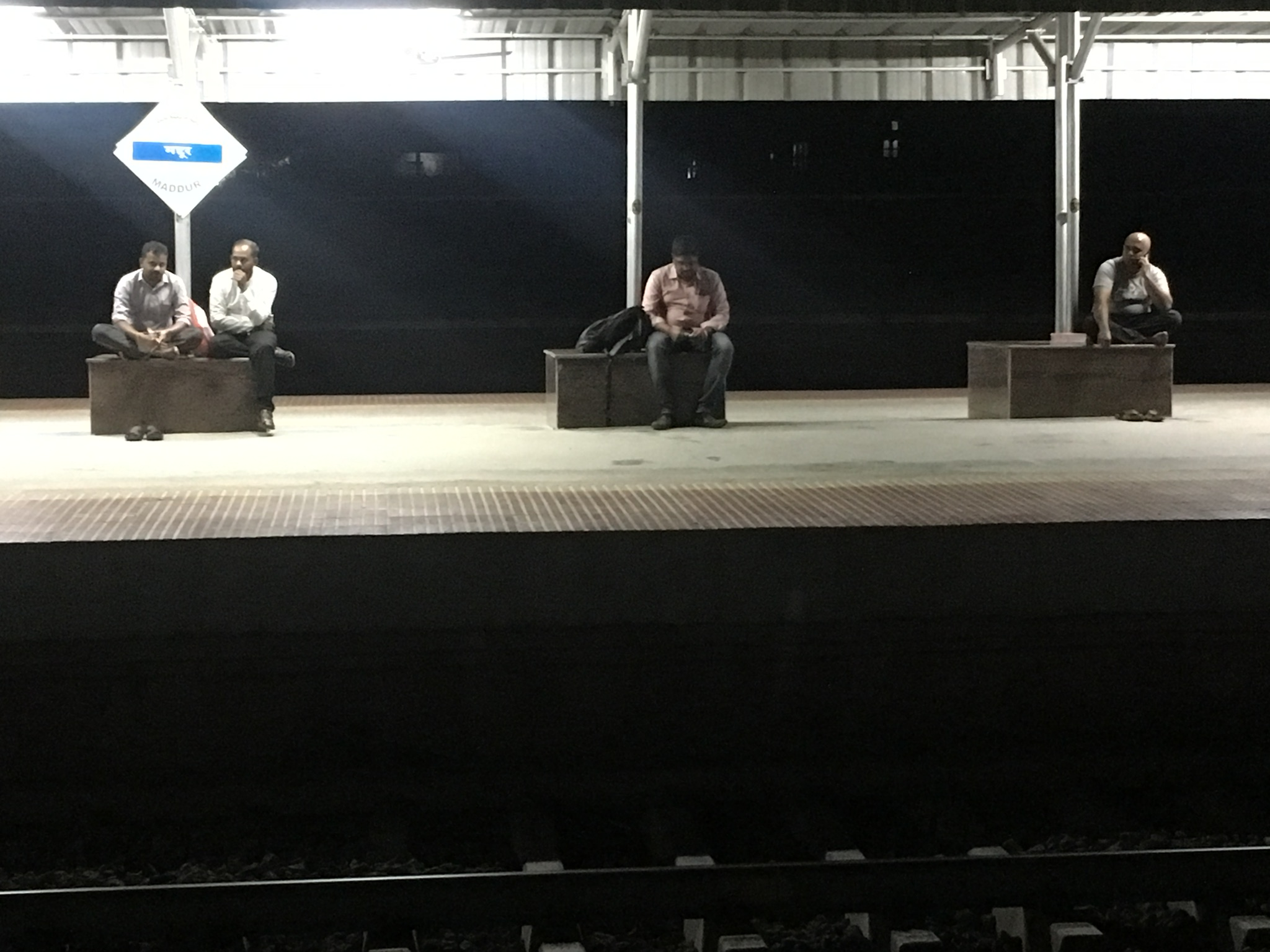
Maddur railway station

Mandya district has an extensive road network. NH-275, NH 948 and NH-150A pass through the district. The road network in the district includes 73 kilometres (45 mi) of the National Highways, 467 kilometres (290 mi) of State Highways and 2,968 kilometres (1,844 mi) of major district roads.

Mandya belongs to "South Western Railways" of "Indian Railways". Mandya has many railway stations which are listed below:

1. Mandya railway station
2. Maddur railway station
3. Pandavapura railway station
4. Srirangapattana railway station
5. BG Nagar railway station.

== Demographics ==
Historical population
Year	Pop.	±% p.a.
1901	482,581	—
1911	504,157	+0.44%
1921	542,421	+0.73%
1931	581,836	+0.70%
1941	634,727	+0.87%
1951	716,583	+1.22%
1961	899,210	+2.30%
1971	1,154,374	+2.53%
1981	1,418,109	+2.08%
1991	1,644,374	+1.49%
2001	1,763,705	+0.70%
2011	1,805,769	+0.24%

Religions in Mandya district (2011)
Religion	Percent
Hinduism	94.85%
Islam	4.31%
Christianity	0.47%
Other or not stated	0.31%

According to the 2011 census, Mandya district has a population of 1,805,769, roughly equal to the nation of The Gambia or the US state of Nebraska. This gives it a ranking of 263rd in India (out of a total of 640). The district has a population density of 365 inhabitants per square kilometre (950/sq mi) . Its population growth rate over the decade 2001–2011 was 2.55%. Mandya has a sex ratio of 989 females for every 1,000 males, and a literacy rate of 70.14%. 17.08% of the population lives in urban areas. Scheduled Castes and Scheduled Tribes make up 14.69% and 1.24% of the population respectively.

Languages of Mandya district (2011)
1. Kannada (91.9%)
2. Urdu (4.24%)
3. Tamil (1.34%)
4. Telugu (1.30%)
5. Others (1.20%)

At the time of the 2011 census, 91.92% of the population spoke Kannada, 4.24% Urdu, 1.34% Tamil and 1.30% Telugu as their first language.

== Notable people ==
- Ambareesh - Film actor, politician
- Anasuya Shankar - known as Triveni, a novelist in Kannada language
- Jayalalithaa - 5th Chief Minister of Tamil Nadu, born in Melukote in Pandavapura taluk of Mandya district
- S M Krishna - Former Chief Minister of Karnataka, Former Governor of Maharashtra, Former External affairs minister of Govt of India
- K. S. L. Swamy - Film maker and actor
- Jayalakshmi Seethapura - folklorist and writer; born in Pandavapura taluk
- Mandya Ramesh - theatre and film actor
- Nagathihalli Chandrashekhar, filmmaker
- H. L. Nagegowda- folklorist, writer, founder of the museum 'Jaanapada loka', born in Nagamangala taluk
- P. T. Narasimhachar - poet from Melukote
- K. S. Narasimhaswamy - Kannada poet, born in Kikkeri, K. R. Pete taluk
- Prem - film director
- Sathish Ninasam - Kannada Film actor
- C S Puttaraju - Former Minor Irrigation Minister of Karnataka Government, Former Member of Parliament.
- B. S. Ranga - film maker
- Ramya - South Indian actress and the youngest MP of India in the 15th Loksabha
- H. R. Shastry - Veteran actor in Kannada
- Vijaya Narasimha- Kannada film lyricist from Pandavapura taluk
- Shani Mahadevappa - veteran actor
- Malavalli Mahadevaswamy - popular folk singer
- B.S.Yediyurappa- Karnataka's 25th chief minister

== Villages ==
- Madla
- Basavalinganadoddy
- KM Doddi
- Valalekattekoppal
- Maranachakanahalli
- Sathanur, Mandya
- Ganadalu, Mandya
