= Nadoja Award =

The Nadoja Award (Kannada: ನಾಡೋಜ ಪ್ರಶಸ್ತಿ) is an award presented annually by Kannada University, Hampi, India to eminent personalities for their contribution in various fields. The word "Nadoja" belongs to Adikavi Pampa which means `teacher to the Land's.

== Recipients ==
The recipients of Nadoja Award are:

Year	Name	Picture	Field
1995	Kuvempu		Literature
1995	S. Nijalingappa		Politics
1995	Gangubai Hangal		Hindustani Music
1996	Patil Puttappa		Journalism
1996	P. T. Narasimhachar		Literature
1997	K. Shivaram Karanth		Literature
1997	S. K. Karim Khan	–	Literature, Folklore studies
1998	Puttaraj Gawai		Classical Music
1998	Hosur Narasimhaiah		Education
1998	B.Shaik Ali		
1998	R.M.Hadapad		Arts
1998	Vyakarana teertha Chandrasekhar Sastry		Literature
1999	Rajkumar		Arts
1999	Javare Gowda		Literature
1999	George Michell		History
1999	R. C. Hiremath		Linguistics
2000	A. N. Murthy Rao		Literature
2001	Udupi Ramachandra Rao		Science
2001	Bhimsen Joshi		Music
2001	G. S. Shivarudrappa		Literature
2001	K. Venkatalakshmamma		Dance
2002	H. L. Nage Gowda		Literature
2002	Chennaveera Kanavi		Literature
2002	C. N. R. Rao		Science
2003	K. S. Nissar Ahmed		Literature
2003	Subhadramma Mansur		Drama
2003	L. Narayana Reddy		Agriculture
2003	Chandrashekhara Kambara		Literature
2003	Geetha Nagabhushan		Literature
2003	G. Narayana		Literature
2004	M. Chidananda Murthy		Literature
2004	G.S.Khande Rao		Arts
2004	Siri Ajji		Folk Music
2005	G. Venkatasubbiah		Lexicography
2005	C. Parvathamma		Sociology
2005	Sara Aboobacker		Literature
2005	Enagi Balappa		Drama
2005	Naganna Monappa Badigera		Sculpture
2005	Bhadragiri Achyuta Das		Harikatha
2006	Daroji Eramma		Burrakatha
2006	Sarojini Mahishi		Politics
2006	Hampa Nagarajaiah		Literature
2006	Kayyar Kinhanna Rai		Literature
2006	Mudenur Sanganna		Literature
2007	Shantarasa		Literature
2007	S. R. Nayak		Law and Judiciary
2007	Siddalingaiah		Literature
2007	Sukri Bommagowda		Folk Music
2008	L. Basavaraju		Literature
2008	U. R. Ananthamurthy		Literature
2008	Yadramanahalli Doddabharamappa		Puppetry
2008	Kamala Hampana		Literature
2008	Srinivas Havanoor		Literature
2009	Saalumarada Thimmakka		Social Work
2009	Shikaripura Ranganatha Rao		Archaeology
2009	D. N. Shankar Bhat		Linguistics
2009	V.T.Kale		Fine Arts
2009	Muni Venkatappa		Literature
2010	Veerendra Heggade		Philanthropy
2010	M. M. Kalburgi		Education
2010	Baraguru Ramachandrappa		Film Industry
2010	P. B. Sreenivas		Music
2010	Harijana Padmamma		Drama
2011	V. S. Malimath		Law and Judiciary
2011	S L Bhyrappa		Literature
2011	K. G. Nagarajappa		Literature
2011	Yellavva Durgappa Doddappanavar		Folk theatre Art
2011	G. Shankar		Social Service
2011	B. K. S. Iyengar		Yoga
2012	K. P. Rao		Computers
2012	Belagal Veeranna		Puppetry
2012	Brijesh Patel		Sports
2012	B.K.Sumitra		Music
2012	Annadaneshwar Swami		
2012	Gonal Bheemappa		
2012	Mahesh Joshi		
2012	Devanur Mahadeva		Literature
2013	S. K. Shivakumar		Science
2013	Ko Channabasappa		Literature
2013	N. Santosh Hegde		Law and Judiciary
2015	S. R. Ramaswamy		Literature and Journalism
2015	P.S.Shankar		Medical Literature
2015	M.H.Krishnaiah		Literature and Criticism
2017	B.T.Rudresh		Homeopathy
2018	Rajeev Taranath		Classical Music
2019	Manu Baligar		Contribution
2020	Dr Wooday P Krishna		Education
2020	Dr Hanamanthappa		Medicine
2022	Dr C N Manjunath		Medicine
2022	Krishnappa G		Literature
2022	S Shadakshari		Literature
2023	Basavalinga Pattadevaru		Social Service
2023	Tejasvi Kattimani		Education
2023	S.C. Sharma		Science
2025	Shivaraj V. Patil		Law
2025	Kum. Veerabhadrappa		Literature
2025	M. Venkatesh Kumar		Music
