= Saalumarada Thimmakka =

Indian environmentalist (died 2025)

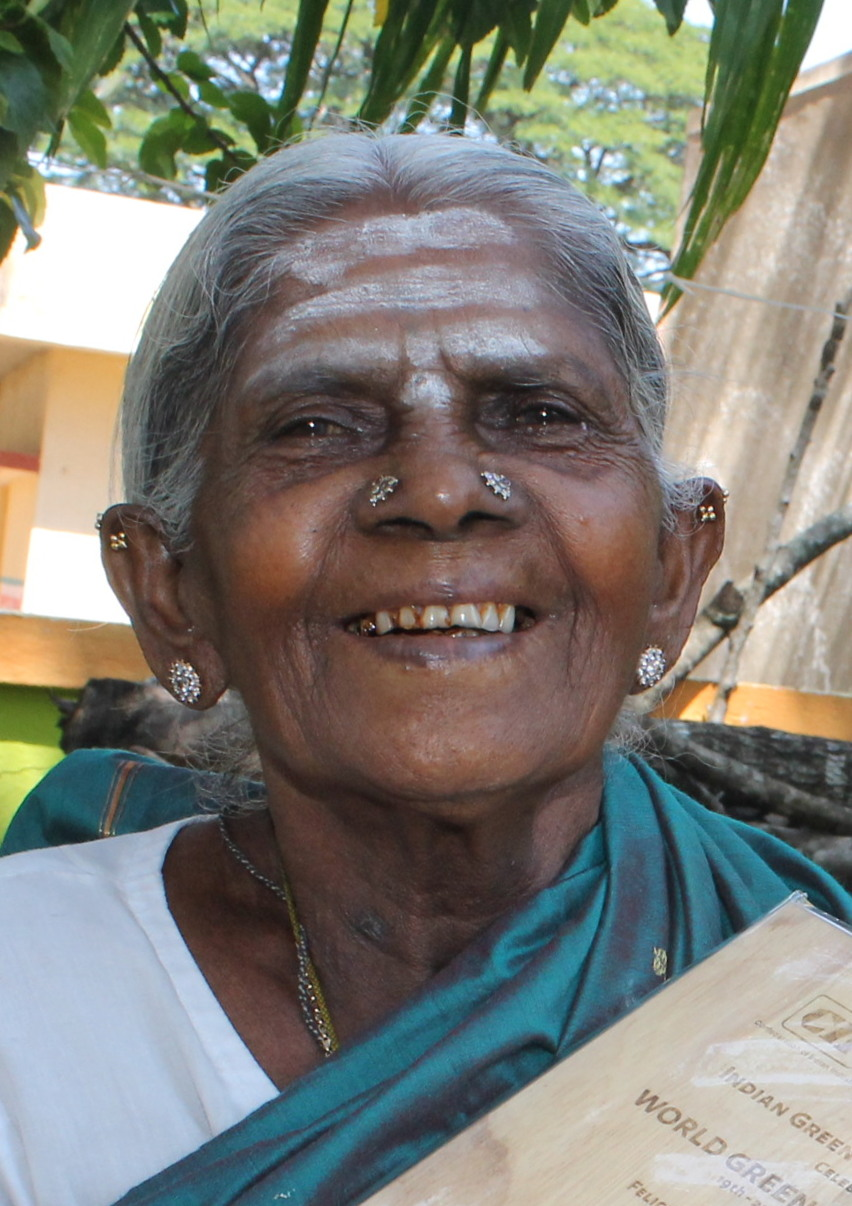
- Thimmakka in 2011
- Born: 30 June 1911 (claimed); Gubbi, Kingdom of Mysore, India (now in Tumakuru district, Karnataka, India)
- Died: 14 November 2025; Bengaluru, Karnataka, India
- Occupation: Environmentalist
- Spouse: Chikkaiah (died 1991)
- Awards: Padma Shri (2019)

Saalumarada Thimmakka (died 14 November 2025), also known as Aala Marada Thimmakka, was an Indian environmentalist from the state of Karnataka, noted for her work in planting and tending to 385 banyan trees along a 4.5-kilometre (2.8 mi) stretch of highway between Hulikal and Kudur, Ramanagara district. She also planted nearly 8000 other trees.

She received no formal education and worked as a casual labourer in a nearby quarry. Her work has been honoured with the National Citizen's Award of India. Her work was recognised by the Government of India and she was conferred with Padma Shri in 2019.

A US environmental organisation based in Los Angeles and Oakland, California called Thimmakka's Resources for Environmental Education is named after her. Central University of Karnataka announced an honorary doctorate for Thimmakka in the year 2020.

Thimmakka died in Bengaluru on 14 November 2025, at the claimed age of 114.

== Early life ==
Thimmakka was said to have been born on 30 June 1911 (although some sources have claimed she was born around 1928), in Gubbi Taluk of Kingdom of Mysore, presently in Tumakuru district of Karnataka. She was married to Chikkaiah, a native of Hulikal village in the Magadi taluk of Ramanagara district in Karnataka. She received no formal education and worked as a casual labourer in a nearby quarry. The couple could not have children. It is said that Thimmakka started to plant banyan trees in lieu of children. The name word Saalumarada (row of trees in the Kannada language) is how she is referred to because of her work. Thimmakka had a foster son named Umesh.

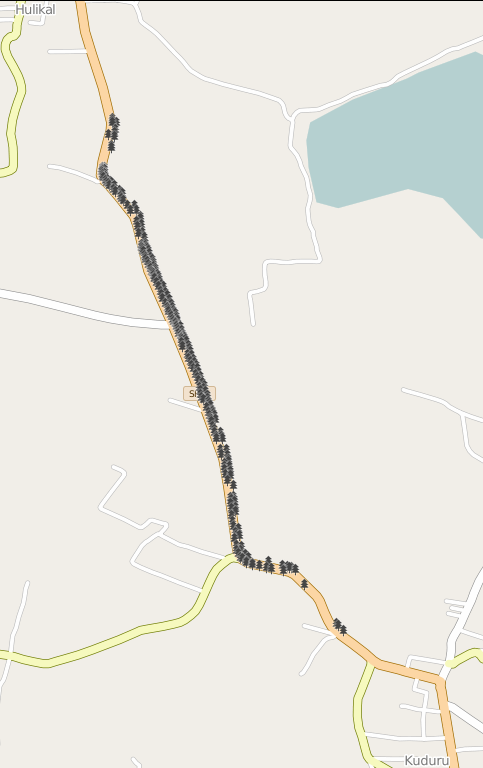
Trees planted by Thimmakka along SH94 from Hulikal to Kuduru village

== Achievement ==
Ficus (banyan) trees were aplenty near Thimmakka's village. Thimakka and her husband started grafting saplings from these trees. Ten saplings were grafted in the first year and they were planted along a distance of 5km near the neighbouring village of Kudur. 15 saplings were planted in the second year and 20 in the third year. She used her meagre resources for planting these trees. The couple used to carry four pails of water for a distance of four kilometres to water the saplings. They were also protected from grazing cattle by fencing them with thorny shrubs.

The saplings were planted mostly during monsoon season so that sufficient rainwater would be available for them to grow. By the onset of the next monsoons, the saplings had invariably taken root. In total, 384 trees were planted, and their asset value has been assessed at around 1.5 million rupees. The management of these trees has now been taken over by the Government of Karnataka.

The 385 banyan trees planted and nurtured by her came under threat of being chopped down for the widening of Bagepalli-Halaguru road in 2019. Thimmakka requested the Chief Minister H. D. Kumaraswamy and Deputy Chief Minister G. Parameshwara to reconsider the project. As a result, the government decided to look for alternatives to save the 70-year-old trees.

== Later activity ==
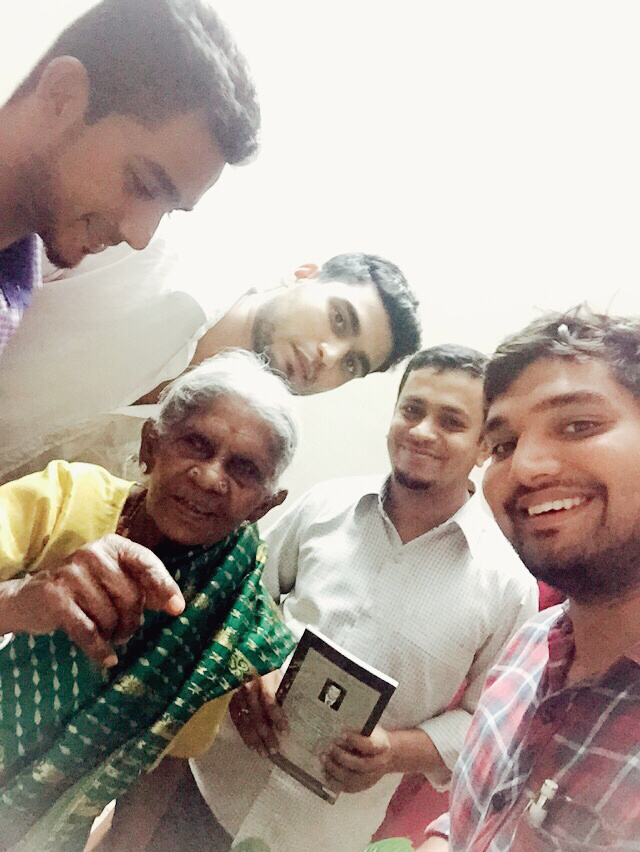
Thimmakka with members of Campus Friend of India on World Environment Day, 2015

Thimmakka's husband died in 1991. Thimmakka was invited to many afforestation programs in India. She was also involved in other social activity like constructing a tank to store rainwater for the annual fair held in her village. She also had a dream of constructing a hospital in her village in remembrance of her husband and a trust has been set up for this purpose. In 1999, a documentary titled Thimmakka Mathu 284 Makkalu was made on her work and it featured in the 2000 International Film Festival of India. She underwent a hip surgery in December 2020 and was announced to be successful.

== BBC recognition ==
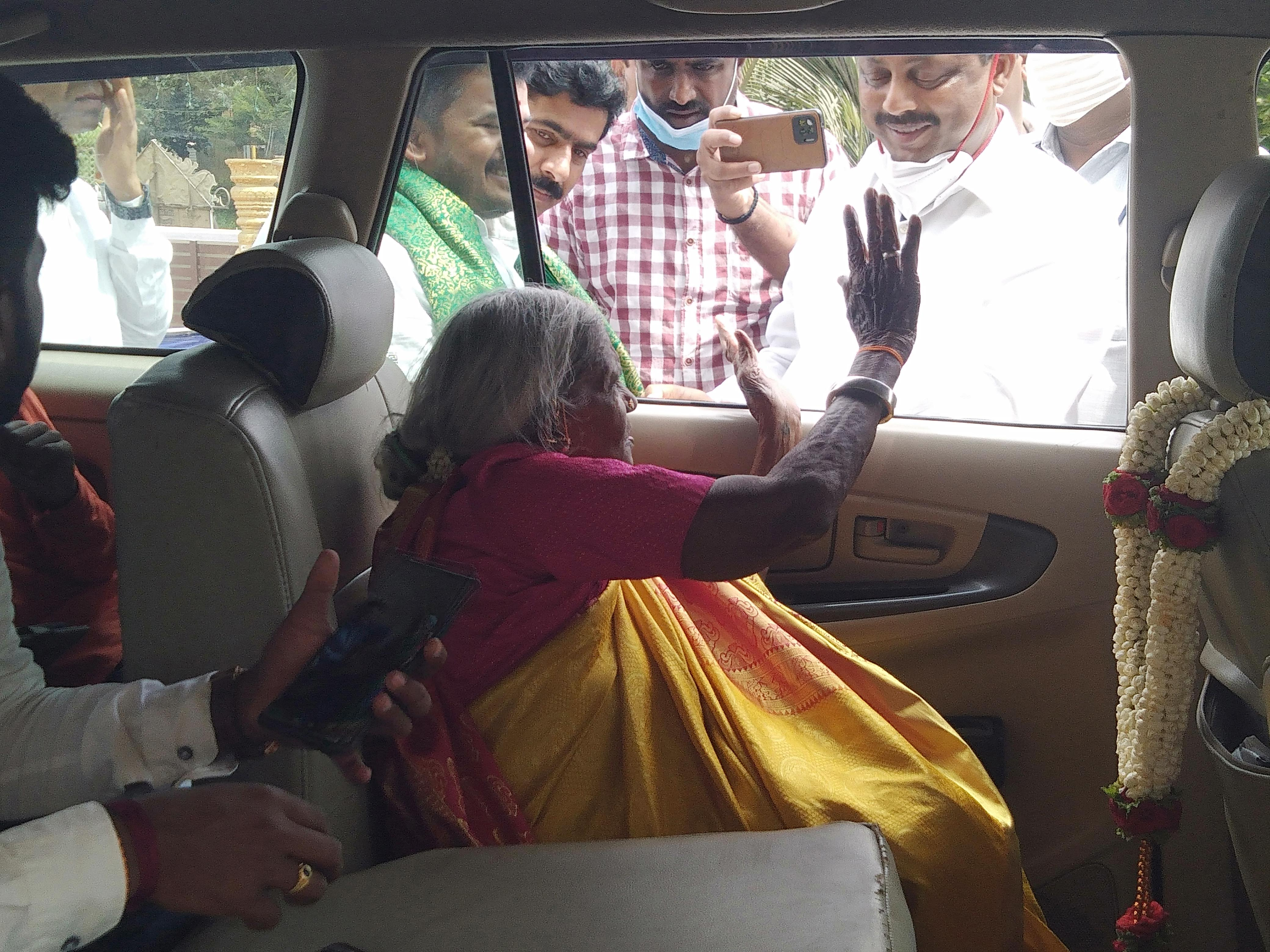
Saalumarada Thimmakka attending a Kalyanotsava

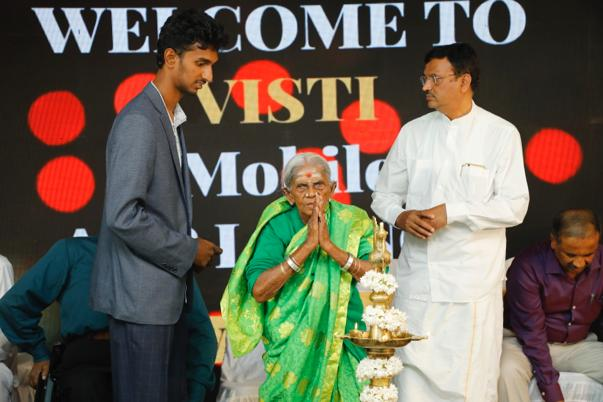
While launching an App

In 2016, Saalumarada Thimmakka was listed by the British Broadcasting Corporation as one of the most influential and inspirational women of the world.

== Alleged misuse of name ==
Delhi-settled comedian, Ritu Vasu Primlani has been accused by Thimmakka of misusing her name. Thimmakka filed a private complaint before the Ramanagara Judicial Magistrate First Class (JFMC) court on 9 May against a non-resident Indian, Ritu Primlani, for running the organisation named after her for at least 14 years without her consent or knowledge.

Primlani had started the non-profit organisation more than a decade prior to the allegations. Thimmakka's adopted son, Umesh has claimed that the organisation misuses her name to collect donations. Primlani had visited Thimmakka back in 2003 where photos were taken of her gifting Thimmakka with a saree. Now she is said to have allegedly taken Thimmakka's fingerprints, while she says Thimmakka okayed the non-profit back then in front of a judge.

Following the complaint, a policeman arrived at Alliance Française and Jagriti in Bangalore, venues where Primlani was performing her shows, to take her into custody. Ms Primlani claimed that she was taken into custody by a male policeman, after dark, which is against the law. She said that a dozen policemen had arrived at the venue though they did not disrupt her show. She claimed to be harassed by Thimmakka's lawyers with written threats, which is an indication of extortion.

In 2014, the High Court of Karnataka adjudicated in Primlani's favour.

== Illness and death ==
Thimmakka was suffering from breathing problems and other age related issues lately, for which she was hospitalised multiple times. She died on 14 November 2025, at the claimed age of 114.

== Awards ==
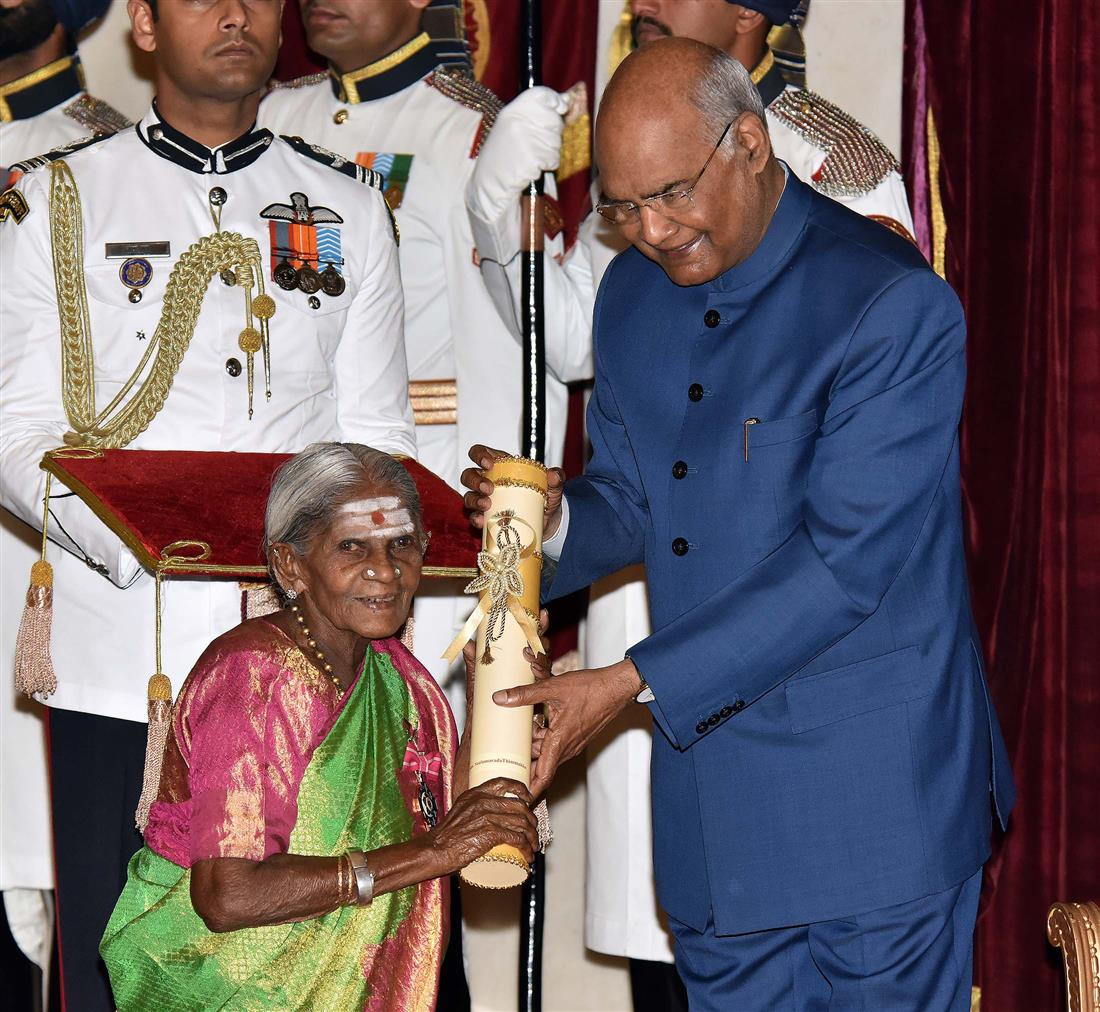
Saalumarada Thimmakka while receiving Padma Shri award from President Ram Nath Kovind

For her achievement, Thimmakka was conferred with the following awards and citations: Padma Shri Saalumarada Thimmakka. The President, Shri Ram Nath Kovind presenting the Padma Shri Award to Saalumarada Thimmakka, at an Investiture Ceremony, at Rashtrapati Bhavan, in New Delhi on 16 March 2019

- Padma Shri award - 2019
- Nadoja Award By Hampi University - 2010
- National Citizen's award - 1995
- Indira Priyadarshini Vrikshamitra Awards - 1997
- Veerachakra Prashasthi Award - 1997
- Honour Certificate from the Women and Child Welfare Department, Government of Karnataka
- Certificate of Appreciation from the Indian Institute of Wood Science and Technology, Bengaluru.
- Karnataka Kalpavalli Award - 2000
- Godfrey Phillips Bravery Award - 2006.
- Vishalakshi Award by Art of Living Organisation
- Vishwathma Award by Hoovinahole Foundation - 2015
- One of BBC's 100 Women in 2016
- Honoured with She's Divine Award by I and You Being Together Foundation 2017
- Parisara Rathana award
- Green champion award
- Vrikshamatha award
