= Rajeev Taranath =

Indian classical musician (1932–2024)

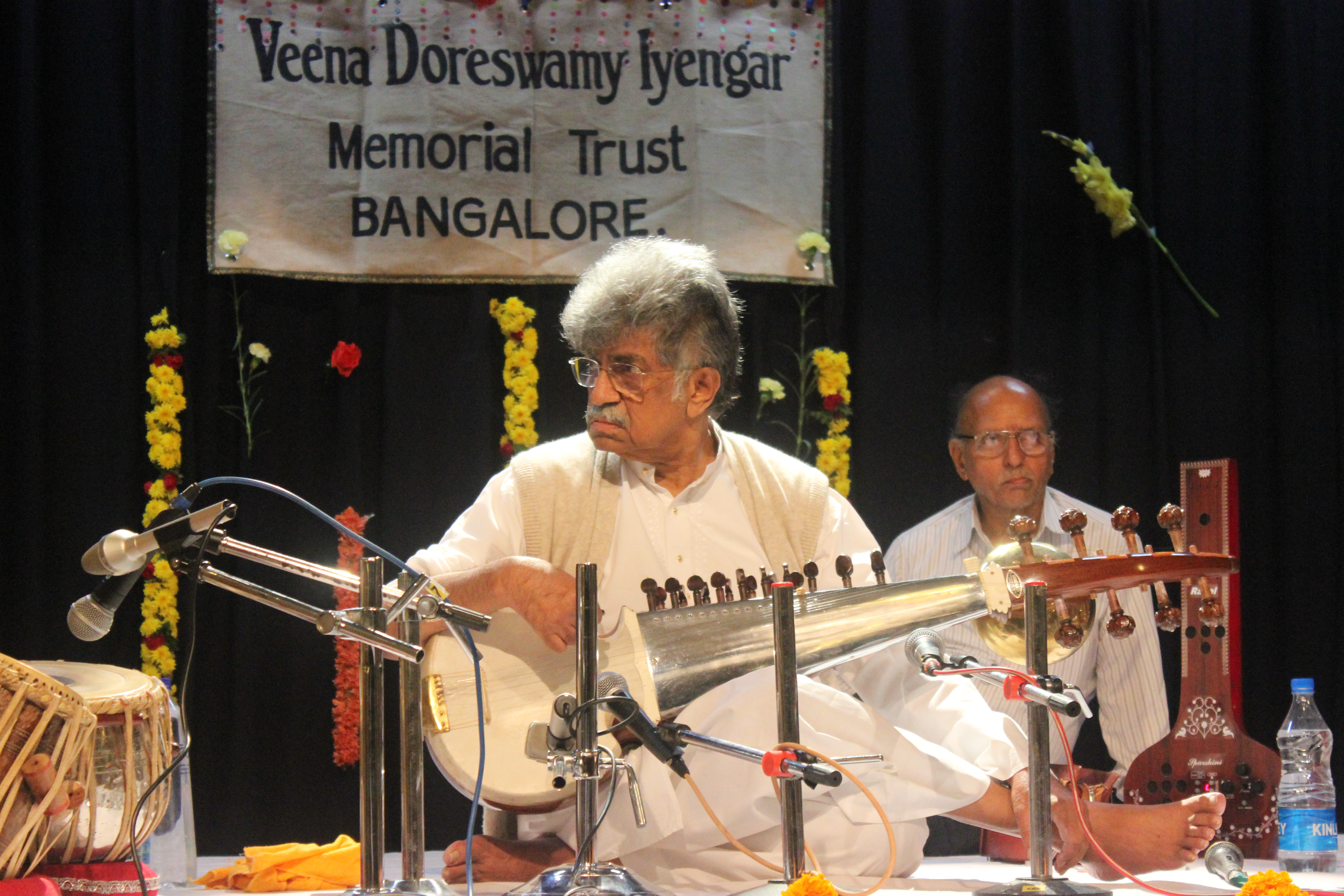
- Rajeev at a concert in Bengaluru

Background information
- Born: 17 October 1932; Bangalore, Kingdom of Mysore, British India (now Bengaluru, Karnataka, India)
- Died: 11 June 2024 (aged 91) Mysuru, Karnataka, India
- Genre: Hindustani classical music
- Instrument: Sarod
- Website: Official website

Rajeev Taranath (17 October 1932 – 11 June 2024) was an Indian classical musician who played the sarod. Taranath was a disciple of Ali Akbar Khan.

== Life and career ==
Rajeev Taranath was born in Bangalore on 17 October 1932. He received his initial training in vocal music from his father Pandit Taranath. He gave his first public vocal performance when he was nine years old. Rajeev was singing for the All India Radio before he was twenty.

Although Rajeev held a PhD in literature, he decided to give up his career as a Professor and Head of English Literature at Regional Engineering College, Tiruchirappalli (REC-T). He then went to Calcutta, where he began his musical training under the tutelage of Ali Akbar Khan. Rajeev continued to learn from his Guru till Khan's death in 2009. He also had guidance from Ravi Shankar, Annapurna Devi, Nikhil Banerjee and Aashish Khan. He received some of India's highest national honours including the 2019 Padma Shri award and the Sangeet Natak Akademi in 1999–2000. He researched and published the Teaching Techniques of the Maihar-Allauddin Gharana, as a Ford Foundation scholar (1989 to 1992).

Taranath was respected for his in-depth understanding as he unfolded the raga, the tonal quality and power of his strokes. His distinctive style showed technical excellence, imaginative power and emotional range. According to The New York Times, "RAJEEV TARANATH'S sarod improvisations Sunday at Soundscape mixed the spiritual and the spirited".

Taranath performed extensively in India and the world. He toured Australia, Europe, Yemen, the United States, and Canada. He composed the music for many internationally acclaimed Indian films including Samskara, Kanchana Sita and Kadavu. He also served as the head of the Indian music programme at the World Music Department of the California Institute of the Arts from 1995 to 2005.

Taranath lived and taught in Mysore, Karnataka until his death. He taught English literature at the University of Aden in the 1980s. Taranath died on 11 June 2024, at the age of 91.

== Discography ==
Taranath had several recordings published:

- In concert: Raga Bageshri Kanada, Manj Khammaj and Bhairavi (IMPU 2020)
- Hamdard - Puriya Dhanshri, Chandrandan(Bihaan Records 2015)
- Prism - Gaur Sarang, Madhuvanti, Bhairavi(Bihaan Records 2014)
- Swar Kalyan (Navras Records 2011)
- Sandhya (Bihaan Records2011)
- Manan "Meditation": Ragas Bihag and Bhairavi (Navras Records 2008)
- Harmony: Sindhu Bhairavi Raagmala (2007)
- Raga Kafi: Some Facets (2007)
- Rasarang (2004)
- Reflections Around Noon : Ragas Todi and Kafi (2003)
- The Call of Love, The Art of Persian and Indian Improvisations (2002)
- Daybreak and a Candle End (2002)
- Indian Classical Music (2001)
- Rag Nat Bhairo, Rag Kaushi Bhairavi, Bhairavi (1995)
- Over the Moon : Raga Chandranandan (1993)
- Raga Ahir Bhairav/Raga Charukeshi (1991)
- The Magnificence of Yaman Kalyan (1987)
- In the Master's Tradition : Rag Basant Mukhari, Rag Kirwani (1987)
- Rag Kafi
- Rag Komal Durga
- Rag Puriya Dhanashri

== Awards and recognitions ==
- Basavashree Award, 2021
- S.V. Narayanarao Memorial National Award, 2020
- Padma Shri, 2019
- Nadoja Award from Kannada University, 2018
- Sangeet Vidhwan Award,2018
- The Sangeet Natak Akademi Award, 1999–2000
- Sangeetha Rathna Mysore T. Chowdiah Memorial Award 1998 (Government of Karnataka, India)
- Sangeet Nritya Akademi Award, 1993
- Karnataka Rajya Prashasti, 1996
- Kempe Gowda Award, 2006
- Sangeet Kalaratna from the Gayana Samaja
- Jyothi Subramanya Award
- Brahmaramba N Nagaraja Rao Gold Medal
- V T Srinivasan Memorial Award
