= Hampasandra =

Village in Chickballpur District, India

- Village
- Location in Karnataka, India Hampasandra (India)
- Coordinates: 13.6663375°N 77.3934604°E
- Country: India
- State: Karnataka
- District: Chikkaballapura
- Talukas: Gauribidanur
- Elevation: 684 m (2,244 ft)

Population (2011)
  - Total: 1,141

Languages
  - Official: Kannada, Telugu
- Time zone: UTC+5:30 (IST)
- PIN: 561209
- Telephone code: 08155
- Vehicle registration: KA 40
- Lok Sabha constituency: Chikballapur (Lok Sabha constituency)

Hampasandra is a village in the southern state of Karnataka, India. It is located in the Gauribidanur taluk of Chikkaballapura district in Karnataka. It is situated 15 km (9.3 mi) away from sub-district headquarter Gauribidanur and 60 km away from district headquarter Chikkaballapura.

== Demographics ==
According to Census 2011 information the location code or village code of Hampasandra village is 623694. Hampasandra village belongs to Ramapura gram panchayat.

The total geographical area of village is 943.5 hectares (2,331 acres). Hampasandra has a total population of 1,141 peoples with 545 males and 596 females. There are about 302 houses in Hampasandra village. Gauribidanur is nearest town to Hampasandra which is approximately 15 km away.

== Economy ==
Agriculture the main occupation of Hampasandra people. There is kumadvathi river of life around Hampasandra. The agriculture is rain-dependent. There are no industries in around the region.

== Facilities ==
Hampasandra has below types of facilities.

- Government higher primary School
- Hampasandra KMF (Karnataka Milk Federation) Dairy
- Post Office
- Veterinary Hospital
- Hampasandra Milk Storage Unit

== Temples ==
- Hampeshwara Lord Shiva Temple
- KonadammaTemple
- Sree Rama Temple
- Shaneaiswara Temple
- Sathyamma Devi Temple

== Notable people ==
- Hampa Nagarajaiah, popularly known by his pen name Hampanā, is an Indian scholar in Kannada language and Jainism. He was born at Hampasandra Village.
- Kamala Hampana- is one of the writers in Kannada from Karnataka. She worked immensely as a scholar, a professor, and a follower of ancient Archaic works
