= Ramapura, Gauribidanur =

Village in Chickballpur District

Ramapura
- Village
- Location in Karnataka, India Ramapura (India)
- Coordinates: 13.6176739°N 77.4389028°E
- Country: India
- State: Karnataka
- District: Chikkaballapura
- Talukas: Gauribidanur
- Elevation: 684 m (2,244 ft)

Population (2011)
  - Total: 2,345

Languages
  - Official: Kannada, Telugu
- Time zone: UTC+5:30 (IST)
- PIN: 561208
- Telephone code: 08155
- Vehicle registration: KA 40
- Lok Sabha constituency: Chikballapur (Lok Sabha constituency)

Ramapura is a village in the southern state of Karnataka, India. It is located in the Gauribidanur taluk of Chikkaballapura district in Karnataka. It is situated 15 km away from sub-district headquarter Gauribidanur and 47 km away from district headquarter Chikkaballapura.

== Demographics ==
According to Census 2011 information the location code or village code of Ramapura village is 623205. Ramapura village is also a gram panchayat. Villages comes under Ramapura gram Panchayat are Ramapura, Papaganahalli, Kundihalli, Kudurebalya, Jodibisilahalli and Hampasandra.

The total geographical area of village is 408.6 hectares. Ramapura has a total population of 2,345 peoples with 1,151 males and 1,194 females. There are about 560 houses in Ramapura village. Gauribidanur is nearest town to Ramapura which is approximately 15 km away.

== Economy ==
Agriculture the main occupation of Ramapura people. There are no rivers of life around Ramapura. The agriculture is rain-dependent. There are no industries in around the region.

== Facilities ==
Ramapura has below types of facilities.

- Government higher primary School
- Government high School
- Ramapura KMF (Karnataka Milk Federation) Dairy
- Government Grocery store
- Ramapura Gram Panchayat Office
- Government Primary health center
- Pragathi Krishna Gramin Bank
- Government Nursery School
- Post Office
- Ramapura Power Station
- Gram Panchayat Library

== Temples ==
- Sri Varamahalakshmi Temple
- Anjaneya temple
- Obaleshwara swamy temple
- Maramma temple

== See also ==
Hirebidanur
