= Rajyotsava Awards (2004) =

Awards given by the government of Karnataka, India

2004 Rajyotsava Awards
- Date: 1 November 2004
- Location: Bangalore, Karnataka
- Country: India
- Presented by: Government of Karnataka

The list of Karnataka Rajyotsava Award recipients for the year 2004 is below.

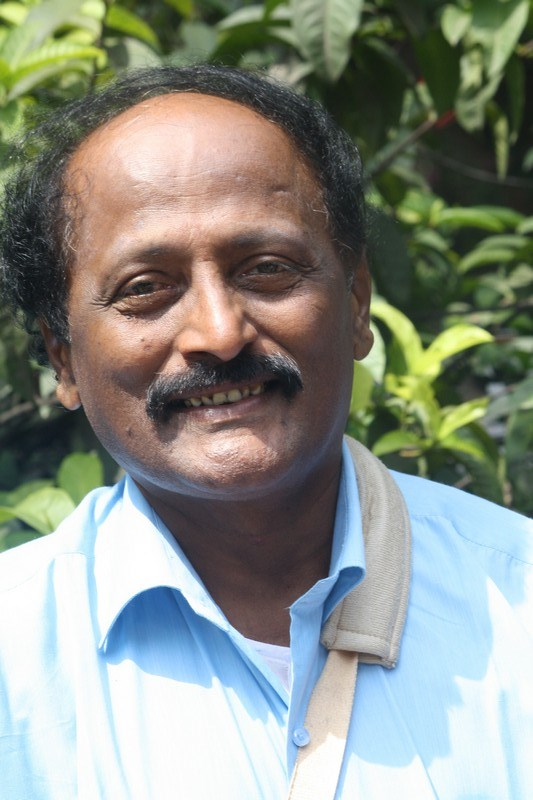
Kum Veerabhadrappa

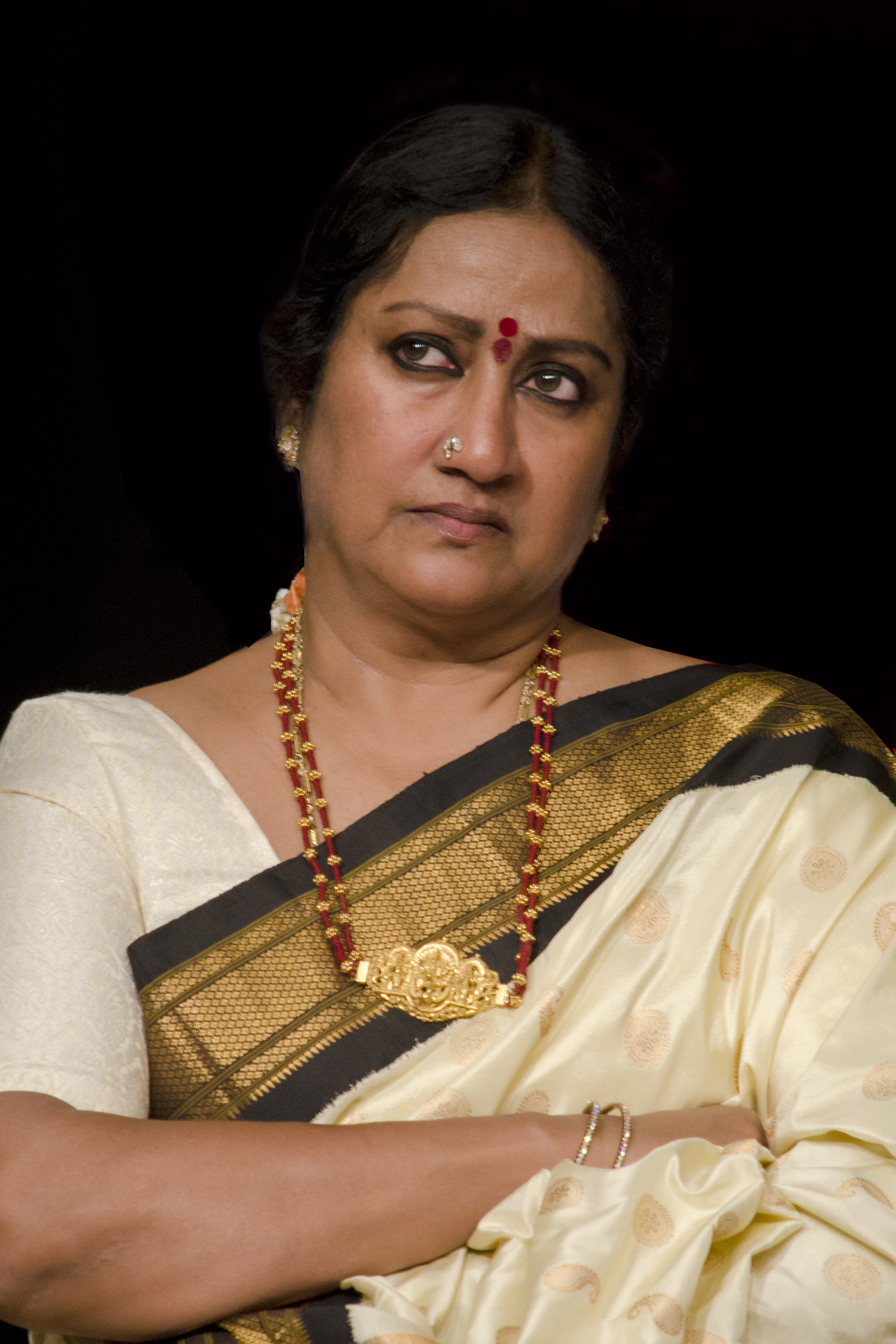
Manju Bhargavi

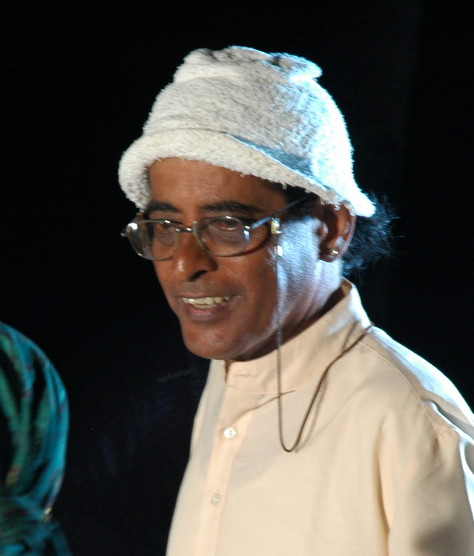
S Ramachandra

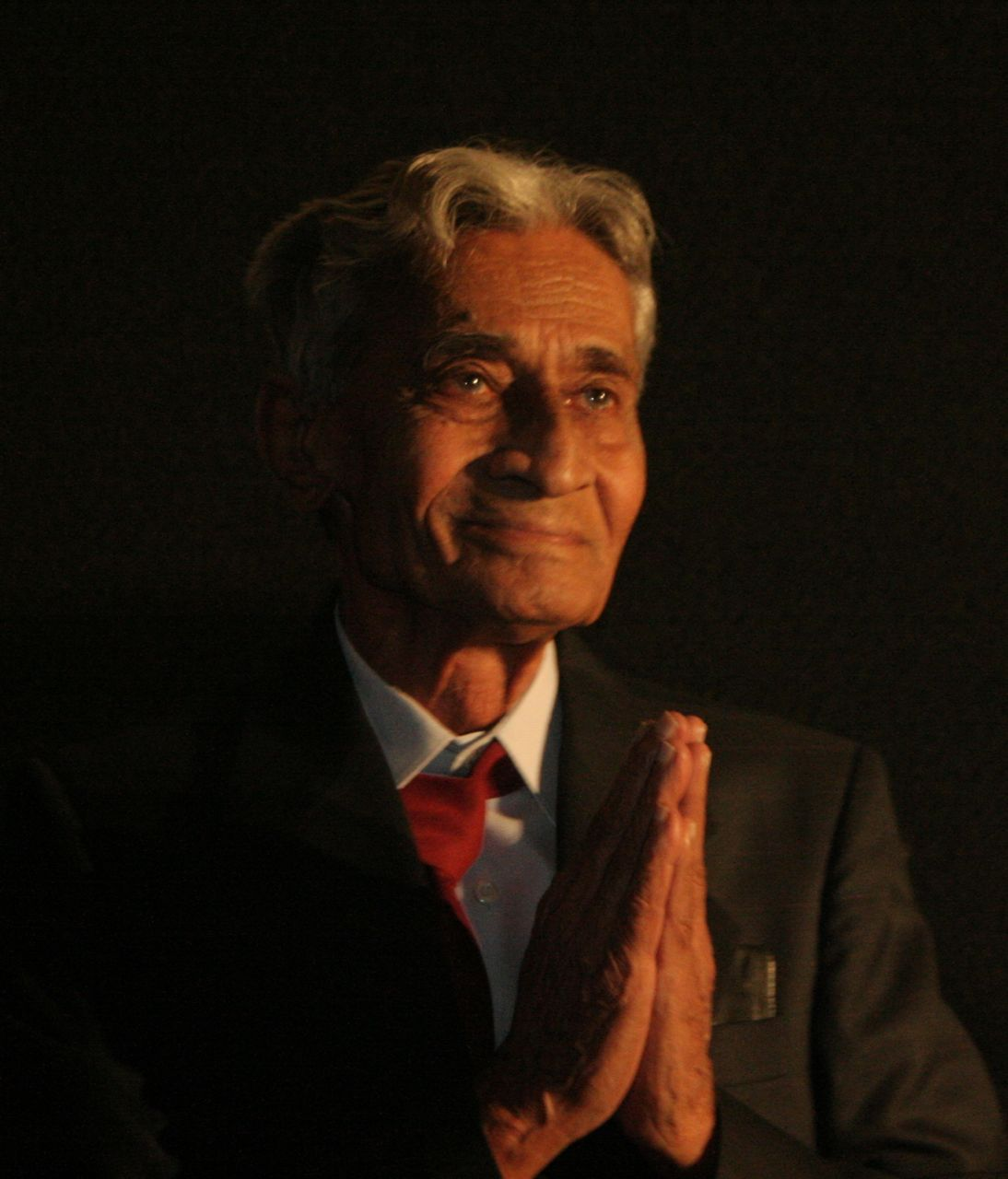
V K Murthy

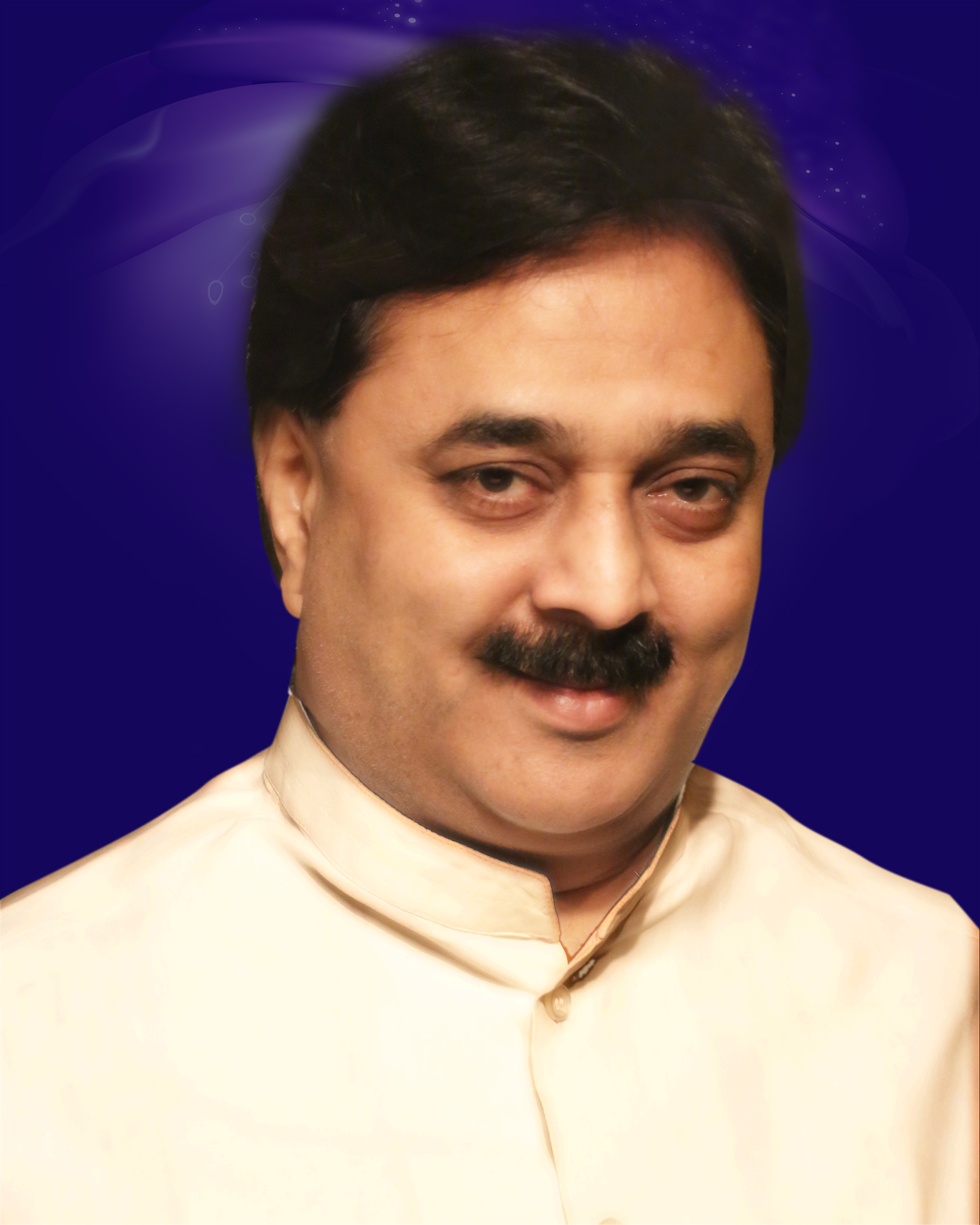
Wooday P Krishna

Recipient	Field
Gurulinga Kapse	Literature
K. Anantharamu	Literature
Na Mogasale	Literature
Nirupama	Literature
H. S. Parvathi	Literature
Kum. Veerabhadrappa	Literature
Aravind Nadakarni	Literature
Gurumurthy Pendakoor	Literature
B. V. Veerabhadrappa	Literature
Khalil Ur Rehman	Literature
Pakkiresh Kanavi	Music
Somanth Maradoor	Music
Parameshwar Hegde	Music
R. K. Padmanabha	Music
Chandrasekhar Maloor	Music
Maarappa Daasar	Music
Shobha Naidu	Music
Y. K. Muddukrishna	Music
Kikkeri Krishnamurthy	Music
Thulasi Ramachandra	Dance
Padmini Ramachandran	Dance
Manju Bhargavi	Dance
Sanehally Panditaradhya Shivacharya Swamiji	Drama
Rajashekhar Kadamba	Drama
Prasanna	Drama
Prabhakar Saathakheda	Drama
Pratibha Narayan	Drama
Harijana Padmamma	Drama
V. T. Kale	Fine Arts
Heeralal Malkari	Fine Arts
Bhaskar Rao	Fine Arts
Veerabhadrachar	Fine Arts
Chikkanarasappa	Folklore
M. S. Lathve	Folklore
Kodi Shankara Ganiga	Folklore
Mathangavva U. Maadara	Folklore
Lingappa Mannoor	Folklore
Harish Kushalappa	Sports
Kavitha Sanil	Sports
Arjun Halappa	Sports
Tharunkumar Rachaiah Mathapathi	Sports
Pailwan Mooga urf Rudra	Sports
K. Y. Venkatesh	Sports
Harini	Cinema
S. Ramachandra	Cinema
K. S. L. Swamy	Cinema
V. K. Murthy	Cinema
B. G. Arun	Overseas Kannadiga
Kalpana Sharma	Overseas Kannadiga
Dayanand Nayak	Overseas Kannadiga
Venkatanarayan	Journalism
Ghulam Munthaq Huq	Journalism
A. Jayaram	Journalism
Shadaksharappa	Journalism
Zia Mir	Journalism
Goverdhan Mehta	Science
Vivek Javali	Medicine
Vijayalakshmi Deshamane	Medicine
Ravi Kishore	Medicine
Muralidhar Rao	Medicine
S. G. Ramanarayana Rao	Medicine
Ghanashyam Bhandge	Social Work
Donna Fernandez	Social Work
Indira Manvikar	Social Work
M. M. Bhat Marakini	Social Work
Gowramma Basavegowda	Social Work
Vasudevacharya	Social Work
Gangadhar	Social Work
Shadaksharappa	Education
H. G. Lakkappa Gowda	Education
H. B. Devaraj Sarkar	Education
Karunashrama	Institution
Veereshwara Punyashrama	Institution
C. V. Gopinath	Others
Belagere Krishnashastry	Others
Mohammed Sharif Gulshan Bidri	Others
Nidumamidi Swamiji	Others
Channabasappa Kelageri	Others
K. N. Somayaji	Others
P. Narasimhamurthy Shastry	Others
S. K. Jain	Others
Madhura Chatrapati	Others
H. R. Chandregowda	Agriculture
S. Thimmegowda	Agriculture
Munivenkategowda	Medicine
H. Shankar Shetty	Medicine
R. N. Shetty	Others
H. S. Lingappa	Education
B. C. Lingappa	Education
Mahadev D. Dikshit	Medicine
Japananda Swami	Social Work
B. Basavaraj	Social Work
C. H. Maridevaru	Writer
B. Mahadevappa	Journalism
Thontesh Shetty	Social Work
B. S. Patil	Social Work
Shirdi Sai Mandali	Social Work
D. K. Adikesavulu	Social Work
Harikrishna Punaroor	Social Work
Chetan Ramarao	Cinema
Cuduvalli Shivaswamy Chandrasekhar	Overseas Kannadiga
William Pinto	Social Work
W. P. Pinto	Social Work
Ramakanth Venson	Medicine
N. M. Prabhu	Medicine
P. C. Subrahmanya	Dance
Nagaraj Rao	Journalism
Sharad Tanga	Medicine
Keshav Jogitthaya	Social Work
M. K. H. Nagalingacharya	Social Work
