= C. Parvathamma =

Indian sociologist and academic (1927–2006)

- Born: 1927; Syagali, Chitradurga (now part of Davanagere district), Mysore, Karnataka
- Died: 1 August 2006; Mysore
- Occupations: Sociologist; professor
- Years active: 1970s–2000s
- Awards: Rajyotsava Award (1990); Nadoja Award (2005)

Academic background
- Education: University of Manchester; University of Mysore
- Influences: Max Gluckman; Victor Turner; Ian Cunnison

Academic work
- Discipline: Sociology, Anthropology
- Main interests: Caste system, Dalit studies, Adivasi studies
- Notable works: Politics and Religion (1971); New Horizons and Scheduled Castes (1984)

C. Parvathamma (1927–2006) was an Indian sociologist who served as the Professor of Sociology at the University of Mysore from 1970 to 1988. Parvathamma also served as a member of the Anthropological Survey of India from 1975 to 1977. As an academic, she authored 11 books and over 70 research articles. For her sociological work in Karnataka, she was awarded the Rajyotsava Award (1990) and the Nadoja Award (2005). Parvathamma is regarded as the first Dalit woman sociologist in India. She also served as a member of the Indian Council of Social Science Research.

== Early life and education ==
Parvathamma was born in 1927 in Syagali, a small village in the Chitradurga (now part of Davanagere district) of Mysore (now Mysuru) in Karnataka. Since her father died very young, she was raised by her mother with the help of her maternal grandmother. Parvathamma completed her early schooling in the village.

After completing her intermediate studies in 1946, she joined Maharaja's College, Mysore, where she earned a B.A. (Hons.) in Social Philosophy with a university-first rank. She also completed her Master's at the University and taught as a junior faculty member for the next five years.

In 1956, with the support of a government scholarship, she pursued her higher education at the University of Manchester, where she was trained under Ian Cunnison and Victor Turner and later received her PhD in Sociology under the supervision of Max Gluckman.

== Career ==
In 1961, Parvathamma returned to India and joined the Maharaja's College, University of Mysore, where she was appointed as a Reader in 1962, and later became the Head of the Sociology Department in 1964. She was promoted to the post of Professor of Sociology in 1970, a position she held until her retirement in June 1988.

As a sociologist, Parvathamma's initial studies centred around northern Karnataka. In her work, Politics and Religion: A Study of Historical Interaction between Socio-Political Relationships in a Mysore Village (1971), she explores the inter-caste conflicts and relationships within a village in the north region of Karnataka. Her next work, Sociological Essays on Veerasaivism (1972), is a collection of essays where she discusses the political movements of the Veerasaiva community in Mysore.

Sociologist Ramarao Indira notes that in the early 1970s, Parvathamma conducted a pioneering work on Scheduled Castes and Scheduled Tribes in Karnataka. In this study, she surveyed 2,583 rural households and 748 urban households of SCs and STs across all 19 districts of the state, and it was published in 1984. Through this study, she also discussed caste inequalities and criticised the government aid as mere pity-driven 'doles'. For the advancement of Adivasi studies, she founded the Centre for Research in Rural and Tribal Studies. Some of her publications on Adivasi people include Aadivaasi Samudayagala Baduku-Bavane (2005) and Aadivaasi Samudayagala Abhivruddhi (2006). Throughout her career, she authored 11 books and published around 70 articles.

Apart from sociological academic works, she served as a member of Anthropological Survey of India from 1975 to 1977. She also served as a Member of Central Advisory Board for Harijan welfare, as UN Regional Correspondent in India for the prevention of crime and treatment of offenders and as member of Executive Committee of the Central Social Welfare Board. She was awarded the Rajyotsava Award (1990) and the Nadoja Award (2005).

She died on 1 August 2006 in Mysore.

== Publications ==
- Parvathamma, C. (1971). Politics & Religion: A Study of Historical Interaction Between Socio-political Relationships in a Mysore Village. Sterling Publishers. ISBN 978-0-8426-0264-8.
- Parvathamma, C.; Satyanarayana (1984). New Horizons and Scheduled Castes. Ashish Publishing House. ISBN 978-0-8364-1263-5.
- Parvathamma, C. (1989). Scheduled Castes at the Cross Roads. Ashish Publishing House. ISBN 978-81-7024-257-4.
