= Alakapura =

Village in Chickballpur District

- Village
- Location in Karnataka, India Alakapura (India)
- Coordinates: 13.5550846°N 77.5159694°E
- Country: India
- State: Karnataka
- District: Chikkaballapura
- Talukas: Gauribidanur
- Elevation: 684 m (2,244 ft)

Population (2011)
  - Total: 3,208

Languages
  - Official: Kannada
- Time zone: UTC+5:30 (IST)
- PIN: 561213
- Telephone code: 08155
- Vehicle registration: KA 40
- Lok Sabha constituency: Chikballapur (Lok Sabha constituency)

Alakapura is a village in the southern state of Karnataka, India. It is located in the Gauribidanur taluk of Chikkaballapura district in Karnataka. It is situated 8 km away from the sub-district headquarter of Gauribidanur and 36 km away from district headquarter, Chikkaballapura.

== Demographics ==
According to Census 2011, the location code or village code of Alakapura village is 623348. Alakapura village is also a gram panchayat. Villages that come under Alakapura gram Panchayat are Rayarekalahalli, Pothenahalli, Nandiganahalli, Hanumenahalli, Doddahanumenahalli, Chikkahanumenahalli and Alakapura.

The total geographical area of the village is 625.59 hectares. Alakapura has a total population of 3,208 peoples with 1,653 males and 1,555 females. There are about 734 houses in Alakapura village. Gauribidanur is nearest town to Alakapura which is approximately 8 km away.

== Economy ==
People belonging to the Alakapura village grow maize, millet, silk, etc. The major occupations of the residents of Alakapura are dairy farming. The dairy cooperative is the largest individual milk supplying cooperative in the state.

== Facilities ==
Alakapura has below types of facilities.

- Government higher primary School
- Government high School
- Jnanodaya Vidya Samsthe
- Alakapura KMF (Karnataka Milk Federation) Dairy
- Alakapura Grocery store
- Alakapura Gram Panchayat Office
- Government Primary health center
- Post Office
- Gram Panchayat Library

== Temples ==
- Alakapura Sri Channasomeshwara Swami Temple

== See also ==
- Taridalu
