= Daana Chintamani Attimabbe Award =

Indian literary award

Daana Chintamani Attimabbe Award ದಾನಚಿಂತಾಮಣಿ ಅತ್ತಿಮಬ್ಬೆ ಪ್ರಶಸ್ತಿ
- Civilian award for contributions to Kannada literature
- Awarded for: Highest literary award for woman writer of Karnataka
- Sponsored by: Government of Karnataka
- Reward: ₹5 lakh
- First award: 1995
- Final award: 2019

Highlights
- Total awarded: 24
- First winner: T. Sunandamma
- Last winner: Choodamani Nandagopal

The Daana Chintamani Attimabbe Award (or Attimabbe Prashasti) is a literary award that recognizes literary contributions of woman writers in the Indian state of Karnataka. The award was established in 1995 by the government of Karnataka. It is the highest literary honour for woman writers conferred by the Department of Kannada and Culture, Government of Karnataka State, and recognises works written in the Kannada language (one of the 22 official languages of India).

The award is named after Attimabbe, a renowned woman of ancient Karnataka, lived in 950 AD who was parental figure to many Kannada poets including Ranna, Ponna and others. The award comprises a cash prize of ₹5 lakh (US$5,300), a plaque, shawl and garland. The award has been given to women writers for their lifetime contribution to the Kannada literature and is presented by the Chief Minister.

Since its inception in 1995, the award has been given to a total of 24 individuals. T. Sunandamma was the first writer to receive the award and the most recent recipient is Choodamani Nandagopal, who was awarded for the year 2019 for her lifetime contribution.

== Recipients ==
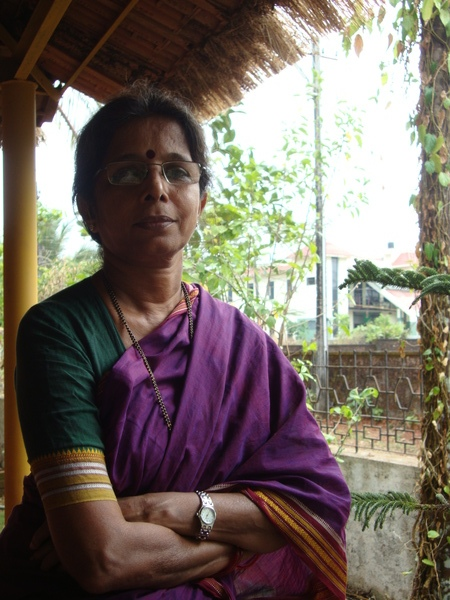
Vaidehi was given the award in 1997

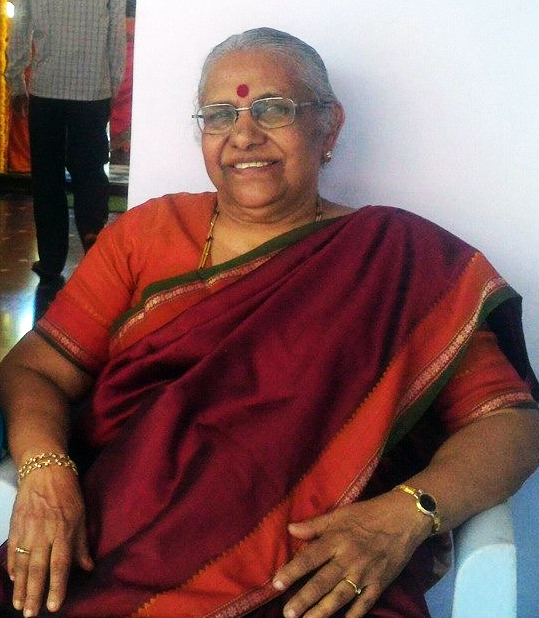
Kamala Hampana awarded in 1998

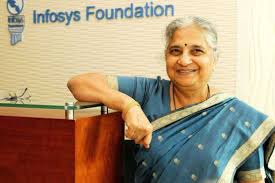
Sudh Murthy was conferred the award in 2010

Year	Writer	Work	Ref.
1995	T. Sunandamma	Lifetime contribution	
1996	Shantadevi Malwada	Lifetime contribution	
1997	Vaidehi	Lifetime contribution	
1998	Kamala Hampana	Lifetime contribution	
1999	Mallika Kadidal	Lifetime contribution	
2000	Jayalakshmi Srinivasan	Lifetime contribution	
2001	Sara Aboobacker	Lifetime contribution	
2002	Geetha Nagabhushan	Lifetime contribution	
2003	Shailaja Udachan	Lifetime contribution	
2004	M. Sunitha Shetty	Lifetime contribution	
2005	Veena Shanteshwar	Lifetime contribution	
2006	B. T. Lalitha Naik	Lifetime contribution	
2007	Shashikala Veeraiah Swamy	Lifetime contribution	
2008	Vijaya Dabbe	Lifetime contribution	
2009	Shantadevi Kanavi	Lifetime contribution	
2010	Sudha Murthy	Lifetime contribution	
2011	Saraswati Chimmalagi	Lifetime contribution	
2012	B. N. Sumitrabai	Lifetime contribution	
2013	M. Saraswati Gowda	Lifetime contribution	
2014	H. S. Srimati	Lifetime contribution	
2015	Nemichandra	Lifetime contribution	
2016	Shanti Nayak	Lifetime contribution	
2017	Sa. Usha	Lifetime contribution	
2018	H. M. Beelagi	Lifetime contribution	
2019	Chudamani Nandagopal	Lifetime contribution	

== See also ==
- Attimabbe
