= Kamala Hampana =

Indian Kannada writer and scholar (1935–2024)

Nadoja Kamala Hampana
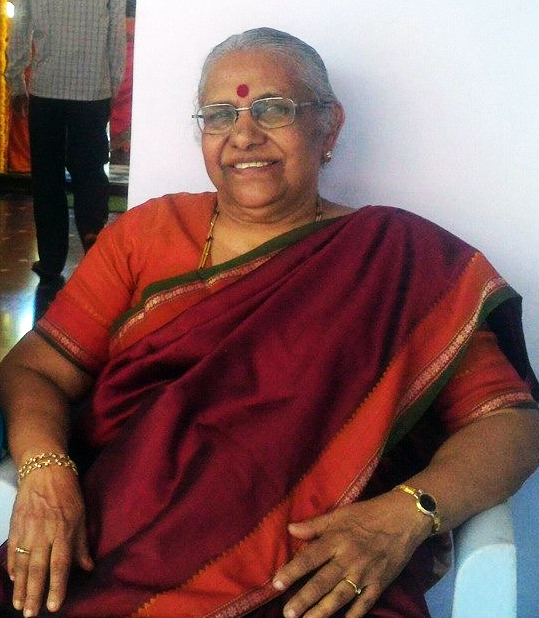
- Kamala in 2017
- Born: 28 October 1935; Devanahalli, Kingdom of Mysore, British India
- Died: 22 June 2024 (aged 88); Bengaluru, Karnataka, India
- Education: University of Mysore
- Occupations: Writer, professor
- Spouse: Hampa Nagarajaiah
- Children: 3
- Writing career
- Pen name: Kamala Priya
- Language: Kannada
- Genres: Poetry; Fiction; Literary criticism Biography
- Notable works: Thuranga Bharata, Anekanathavaada, Jaina Saahitya Parisara
- Notable awards: Sahitya Akademi Award; Rajyotsava Prashasti; Kittur Rani Chennamma Award; Baba Amte Award; Nadoja Award

Kamala Hampana (28 October 1935 – 22 June 2024) was an Indian writer who wrote in the Kannada language. Born in Devanahalli in Karnataka, she worked as a scholar and professor of ancient works and undertook studies on different genres of Kannada literature, as well as topics involving Jainism.

== Background ==
Kamala Hampana was born on 28 October 1935, in Devanahalli, Bangalore, Karnataka to C. Rangadhamanayak and Lakshmamma couple. Kamala's elementary schooling started in Challakere, Karnataka and continued in different villages. In 1953, as a high-school student she completed her SSLC at Tumkur. She continued her college studies in Mysore. During 1955-1958, from University of Mysore she obtained a B.A degree and an M.A degree in the Kannada language (1958). She was conferred a Ph.D. degree for her thesis on Turanga Bhaarata.

Kamala Hampana was married to Hampa Nagarajaiah, also a veteran litterateur in Kannada. The couple had two daughters and a son. She died in Bengaluru, Karnataka on 22 June 2024, at the age of 88.

== Career ==
In 1959, Kamala Hampana started with the profession as Kannada teacher and worked as a Principal at the Government First Grade College, Vijayanagar, Bangalore and then as a Professor at the Maharani College of Bengaluru and Maharaja's College, Mysore.

Upon her retirement from the Government Service, she worked as a Professor in Department of Jainism, Natural Studies, President of Mysore University and President and Visiting Professor of Hampi University. Her research on female sensibility has earned her immense fame. In her writings, she provided a deep insight into Jain works.

== Literary works ==
Kamala Hampana's areas of works include ancient Kannada literature, Jainology and textual criticism. She was involved in the Dalit movement and the women’s movement in Karnataka. Kamala published more than fifty books in various genres of literature such as literary criticism, poetry, fiction and biography.

Kamala Hampana's important publications are:

=== Story compilation (ಕಥಾಸಂಕಲನ) ===
- Nekkitu Haalina Battalu (ನಕ್ಕಿತು ಹಾಲಿನ ಬಟ್ಟಲು)
- Rekke Muriditthu (ರೆಕ್ಕೆ ಮುರಿದಿತ್ತು)
- Chandana (ಚಂದನಾ)
- Bavane (ಬವಣೆ)

=== Research ===
- Thuranga Bharata – Ondu Addhyayana (ತುರಂಗ ಭಾರತ - ಒಂದು ಅಧ್ಯಯನ)
- Shantinaatha (ಶಾಂತಿನಾಥ)
- Adharsha Jaina Mahileyaru (ಆದರ್ಶ ಜೈನ ಮಹಿಳೆಯರು)
- Anekanathavaada (ಅನೇಕಾಂತವಾದ)
- Naadu Nudi Naavu (ನಾಡು ನುಡಿ ನಾವು)
- Jaina Saahitya Parisara (ಜೈನ ಸಾಹಿತ್ಯ ಪರಿಸರ)
- Baddavana (ಬದ್ದವಣ)
- Ronada Basadi (ರೋಣದ ಬಸದಿ)
- Mahamandaleshwari Rani Chennabhairadevi Mattu Ithra Karavali Raniyaru (ಮಹಾಮಂಡಲೇಶ್ವರಿ ರಾಣಿ ಚೆನ್ನಭೈರಾದೇವಿ ಮತ್ತು ಇತರ ಕರಾವಳಿ ರಾಣಿಯರು)

=== Review, rational ===
- Baasinga (ಬಾಸಿಂಗ)
- Baandala (ಬಾಂದಳ)
- Badabaagni (ಬಡಬಾಗ್ನಿ)
- Bittara (ಬಿತ್ತರ)
- Bonbala (ಬೊಂಬಾಳ)
- Gunadamkakaarti Attimabbe (ಗುಣದಂಕಕಾರ್ತಿ ಅತ್ತಿಮಬ್ಬೆ)
- Attimabbe and Chalukyas

=== Editing works ===
- Sukumara Chariteya Sangraha (ಸುಕುಮಾರ ಚರಿತೆಯ ಸಂಗ್ರಹ)
- Bharatesha Vaibhava (ಭರತೇಶ ವೈಭವ)
- K. S. Dharanedraih's Smriti grantha (ಕೆ.ಎಸ್.ಧರಣೇಂದ್ರಯ್ಯನವರ ಸ್ಮೃತಿಗ್ರಂಥ)
- Sree Pacche (ಶ್ರೀ ಪಚ್ಚೆ)
- Sahasrabhisheka (ಸಹಸ್ರಾಭಿಷೇಕ)
- Chavundaraya Purana (ಚಾವುಂಡರಾಯ ಪುರಾಣ)
- Dr D.N. Narasimhacharya's chosen articles (ಡಾ.ಡಿ.ಎನ್.ನರಸಿಂಹಾಚಾರ್ಯರ ಆಯ್ದ ಲೇಖನಗಳು)
- Haleya Gadya Sahithya (ಹಳೆಯ ಗದ್ಯ ಸಾಹಿತ್ಯ)
- Danachintamani - Smaranachintane) (ದಾನಚಿಂತಾಮಣಿ - ಸ್ಮರಣಸಂಚಿಕೆ)
- Jaina Dharma (ಜೈನಧರ್ಮ)
- Suvrna Bharathi- Part-3 (ಸುವರ್ಣ ಭಾರತಿ- ಸಂಪುಟ- ೩)
- jaina kathakosha (Co-author) (ಜೈನಕಥಾಕೋಶ)
- Shodasha Bhavana Kavya (ಷೋಡಶ ಭಾವಾನಾ ಕಾವ್ಯ)

=== Introduction to life ===
- Mahaveerara Jeevana Sandesha (ಮಹಾವೀರರ ಜೀವನ ಸಂದೇಶ)
- Mudimallige (ಮುಡಿಮಲ್ಲಿಗೆ)
- Aa Mukha (ಆ ಮುಖ)

=== Vachana Sankalana ===
- Bindali (ಬಿಂದಲಿ)
- Bugadi (ಬುಗುಡಿ)

=== Children's books ===
- Akkamahadevi (ಅಕ್ಕ ಮಹಾದೇವಿ)
- Helavanakatte Giriyamma (ಹೆಳವನಕಟ್ಟೆ ಗಿರಿಯಮ್ಮ)
- Veeravanithe Obavva (ವೀರವನಿತೆಓಬವ್ವ)
- Janna (ಜನ್ನ)
- Chikkavarigaagi Chithradurga (ಚಿಕ್ಕವರಿಗಾಗಿ ಚಿತ್ರದುರ್ಗ)
- Dr B.R. Ambedkar (ಡಾ.ಬಿ.ಆರ್.ಅಂಬೇಡ್ಕರ್)
- Mualabagilu (ಮುಳಬಾಗಿಲು)
- Makkalodane Maathukathe (ಮಕ್ಕಳೊಡನೆ ಮಾತುಕತೆ)

=== Translation ===
- Beejakshara Maale (ಬೀಜಾಕ್ಷರ ಮಾಲೆ) - Saraswati Baigiri's melody of 65 verses written in Telugu.
- Jaathi Nirmoolane (ಜಾತಿ ನಿರ್ಮೂಲನೆ) - Translation of Dr. Ambedkar's Annihilation of caste
- Bharatadalli Jathigalu (ಭಾರತದಲ್ಲಿ ಜಾತಿಗಳು)
- Asiada Hanathegalu (ಏಷಿಯಾದ ಹಣತೆಗಳು)
- Jathi Mimase (ಜಾತಿಮೀಮಾಂಸೆ)

=== Akashavaani drama - metaphors ===
- Baluku (ಬಕುಳ)
- Banaadi (ಬಾನಾಡಿ)
- Bellakki (ಬೆಳ್ಳಕ್ಕಿ)

=== Autobiography ===
- Beru-Benki-Bilalu

== Awards and recognition ==
Kamala Hampana received the following awards and citations:

- Kamala Hampana was President of the 71st Kannada Sahitya Sammelana (All India Kannada Literary Conference) held at Mudbidri in December 2003.
- Karnataka Sahitya Academy Award
- Karnataka Government's Kitturu Raani Channamma Award (2019)
- Daana Chintamani Attimabbe Award in 1998 by Karnataka Government
- Rajyotsava Prashasti from Karnataka Government
- Baba Amte Award
- Chavundaraya Award from Kannada Sahitya Parishat (2012)
- Nadoja honorary doctorate from Hampi Kannada University (2008)
- Anupama Niranjana Award (2003)
- Siddanthakeerthi Vidvath Award (2013)
- Rashtra Kavi Kuvempu Award (2013)
- Kuvempu Kalavikethana Award
- Ranna Prashasthi (1996)
- Dr. Baba saheb Ambedkar Award (2007)
- Bharat Vikas Ratna Award
- Shruta Samvardhan Rashtreeya Puraskar
- Mahamastakabhisheka rashtreeya Puraskara
- Sandesha Awards 2017
