= Manu Baligar =

Indian writer

Nadoja Dr. Manu Baligar
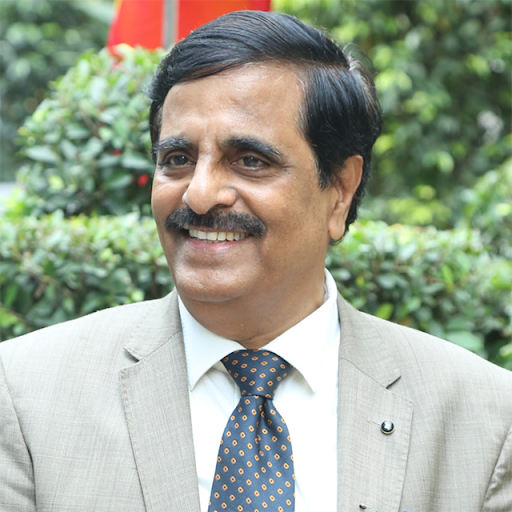
- Born: Shigli, Gadag, Karnataka, India.
- Education: B.A., LL.B., M.A., Honorary Doctorate(s).
- Alma mater: Karnataka University Dharwad.
- Occupations: Poet, Writer, Intellectual, Speaker.
- Organization(s): Kannada Sahitya Parishat. Department of Kannada and Culture, Government of Karnataka.
- Notable work: Belaka Bedagu, Mylaara Mahadeva (2007), Appa (2002), Ati Virala Raajakarani S.R. Kanthi (2001).

Dr. Manu Baligar (Kannada: Manu Baḷigār) is an Indian Kannada writer, author, playwright, former civil servant and the current president of Kannada Sahitya Parishat. He hails from Shigli in Gadag district, and is the elder brother of V. P. Baligar, a retired Indian Administrative Service officer and former chairman of Housing and Urban Development Corporation. He was a civil servant in the Karnataka Administrative Service, and retired as the commissioner of Department of Kannada and Culture, Government of Karnataka. He was elected the president of the Kannada Sahitya Parishat, an apex body for the promotion of Kannada language, on 3 March 2016 for a term of three years which was later legally extended to five years. He has been conferred with many coveted honors including the highly prestigious Nadoja Award by the Hampi University in 2019 and also an honorary doctorate for literature from Karnataka University Dharwad. Also, he has been conferred with two gold medals for his exemplary work on IRDP during his career as a civil servant.

== Works ==
Manu Baligar has been known for his rich contributions to both literature and bureaucracy simultaneously. He has authored over 30 books including five story compilations, six anthologies and four biographies. He also happens to be the only bureaucrat to receive an honorary doctorate from Karnataka University for contributing to Kannada literature. Some of his famous works include Belaka Bedagu - compilation of his columns in Prajavani daily, Mylara Mahadeva - a play on the life of a legendary martyr, and a biography of former chief minister of Karnataka, S. R. Kanthi. He has successfully organized and convened numerous international and national conferences on Kannada Literature including the world renowned Vishwa Kannada Sammelana held at Belagavi in 2011. He has delivered innumerable keynote lectures on Kannada literature in international literary conferences held at countries like UK, America, Australia, Nepal and Singapore. The progress and achievements of the Kannada Sahitya Parishat under his able leadership and presidency has been recorded and presented in the form of books Kaayaka Patha (ಕಾಯಕಪಥ) (progress during the period 03/03/2016 to 31/10/2017) and Kaayaka Nirata (ಕಾಯಕನಿರತ) (progress during the period 01/11/2017 to 05/10/2019) at the Parishat website.

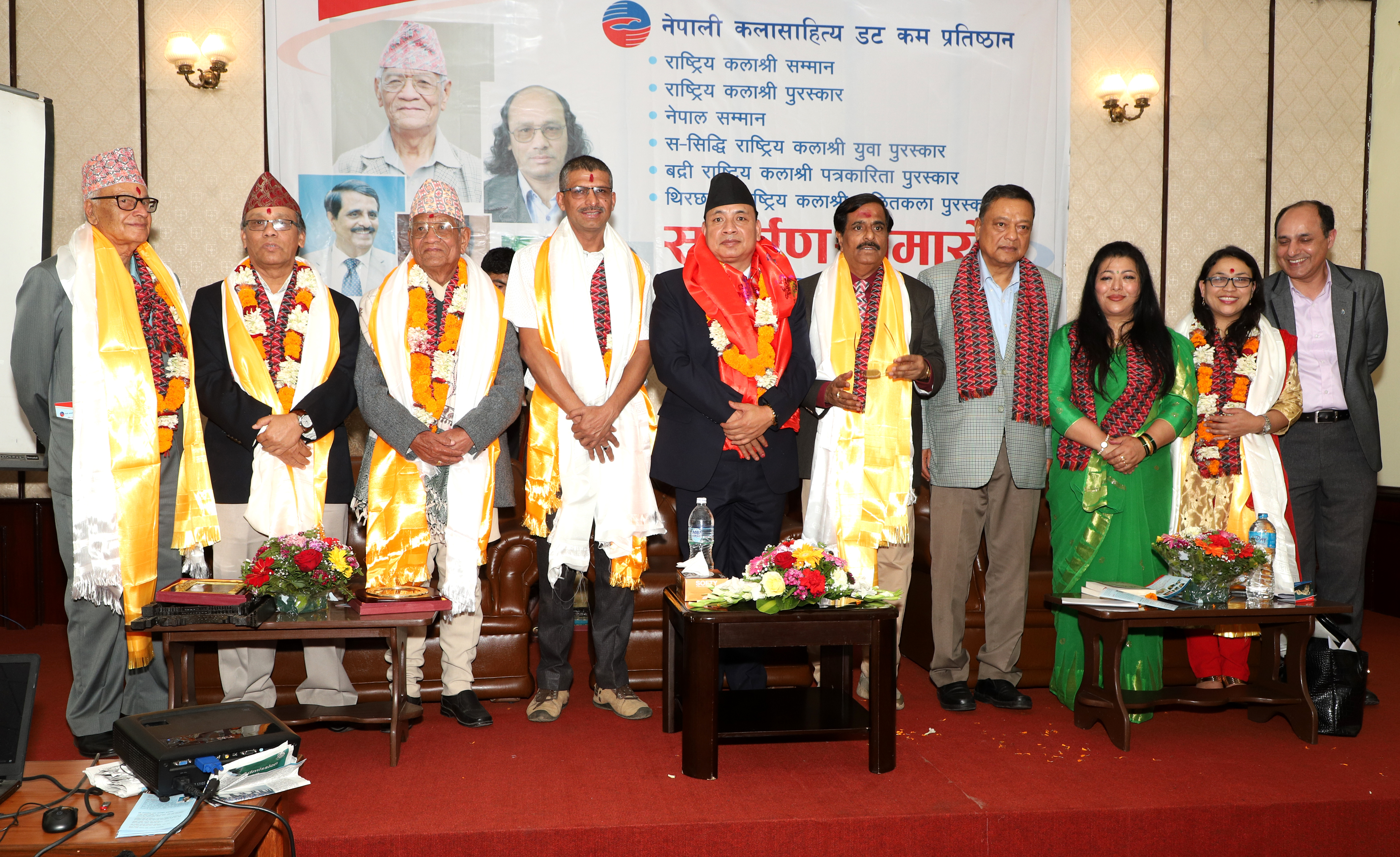
Nadoja Dr. Manu Baligar and other awardees in a group photograph with the Hon'ble Vice President of Nepal, Mr. Nanda Kishor Pun after Kalashree Award ceremony at the office of the Vice President of Nepal in Kathmandu on 11 April 2019.

== Awards and honours ==
- Nadoja Award (2019)
- Lingaraja Desai Award
- Ranna Sahitya Award
- Goruru Sahitya Award
- Vishwamanava Award (2008)
- Kempegowda Sahitya Award

== List of works ==
His works have been translated to English and many other Indian languages like Oriya, Telugu and Hindi. Many of his works have been used as textbooks in schools and universities. Some of his works are listed below.

=== Story compilations ===
- Avyaktha (1983)
- Runa (1998)
- Baduku Mayeya Maata (2002)
- The Debt and other Stories (2004)
- Kelavu Kathegalu (2005)

=== Poetry ===
- Nanna Ninnaolage (1983)
- Yeddavaru Biddavaru (1994)
- Saakshara Geethegalu (1994)
- Niagara Mattu Jalapathagalu (1998)
- Kavi Raveendrara Minchina Hanigalu (2004)
- Aayda Kavanagalu (2011)

=== Essays and short stories ===
- Yekantha Mattu Yekagrathe (2004)
- Belaka Bedagu (2009)
- Samskruthi Vihaara (2012)

=== Plays ===
- Mylaara Mahadeva (2007)

=== Biographies ===
- Appa (2002)
- Ati Virala Raajakarani S.R. Kanthi (2001)
- Abdul Nazeer Saab (2005)
