= Hirebidanur =

Village in Chickballpur District

- Village
- Location in Karnataka, India Hirebidanur (India)
- Coordinates: 13.5992885°N 77.5216687°E
- Country: India
- State: Karnataka
- District: Chikkaballapura
- Talukas: Gauribidanur
- Elevation: 684 m (2,244 ft)

Population (2011)
  - Total: 5,815

Languages
  - Official: Kannada, Telugu
- Time zone: UTC+5:30 (IST)
- PIN: 561208
- Telephone code: 08155
- Vehicle registration: KA 40
- Lok Sabha constituency: Chikballapur (Lok Sabha constituency)

Hirebidanur is a village in the southern state of Karnataka, India. It is located in the Gauribidanur taluk of Chikkaballapura district in Karnataka. It is situated 2 km away from sub-district headquarters Gauribidanur and 33 km away from district headquarters Chikkaballapura.

== Demographics ==
According to Census 2011 information the location code or village code of Hirebidanur village is 623257. Hirebidanur village is also a gram panchayat. Villages comes under Hirebidanur gram Panchayat are Veerlagollhalli, Moorumanehalli, Kurubarahalli, Herebidanur and Cheegatagere.

The total geographical area of the village is 369.38 hectares. Hirebidanur has a total population of 5,815 people with 3,095 males and 2,720 females. There are about 1265 houses in Hirebidanur village. Gauribidanur is the nearest town to Hirebidanur which is approximately 2 km away.

== Economy ==
People belonging to the Hirebidanur village grow very much maize, millet silk, etc. The major occupation of the residents of Hirebidanur is dairy farming. The dairy cooperative is the largest individual milk supplying cooperative in the state.

== Facilities ==
Hirebidanur has the following types of facilities.

- Government higher primary School
- Government high School
- Government First Grade College
- Hirebidanur KMF (Karnataka Milk Federation) Dairy
- Government Grocery store
- Hirebidanur Gram Panchayat Office
- Government Primary health center
- Government Nursery School
- Post Office
- Gram Panchayat Library
- Netaji Stadium
- Sri chowdeshwari kalyana mantapa
- Canara Bank (CNRB0004449)
- KSRTC Depot

== Temples ==
- Gangamma Temple
- Basaveswara temple

== See also ==
Alakapura
