= Vasu Primlani =

Indian stand-up comedian and environmentalist

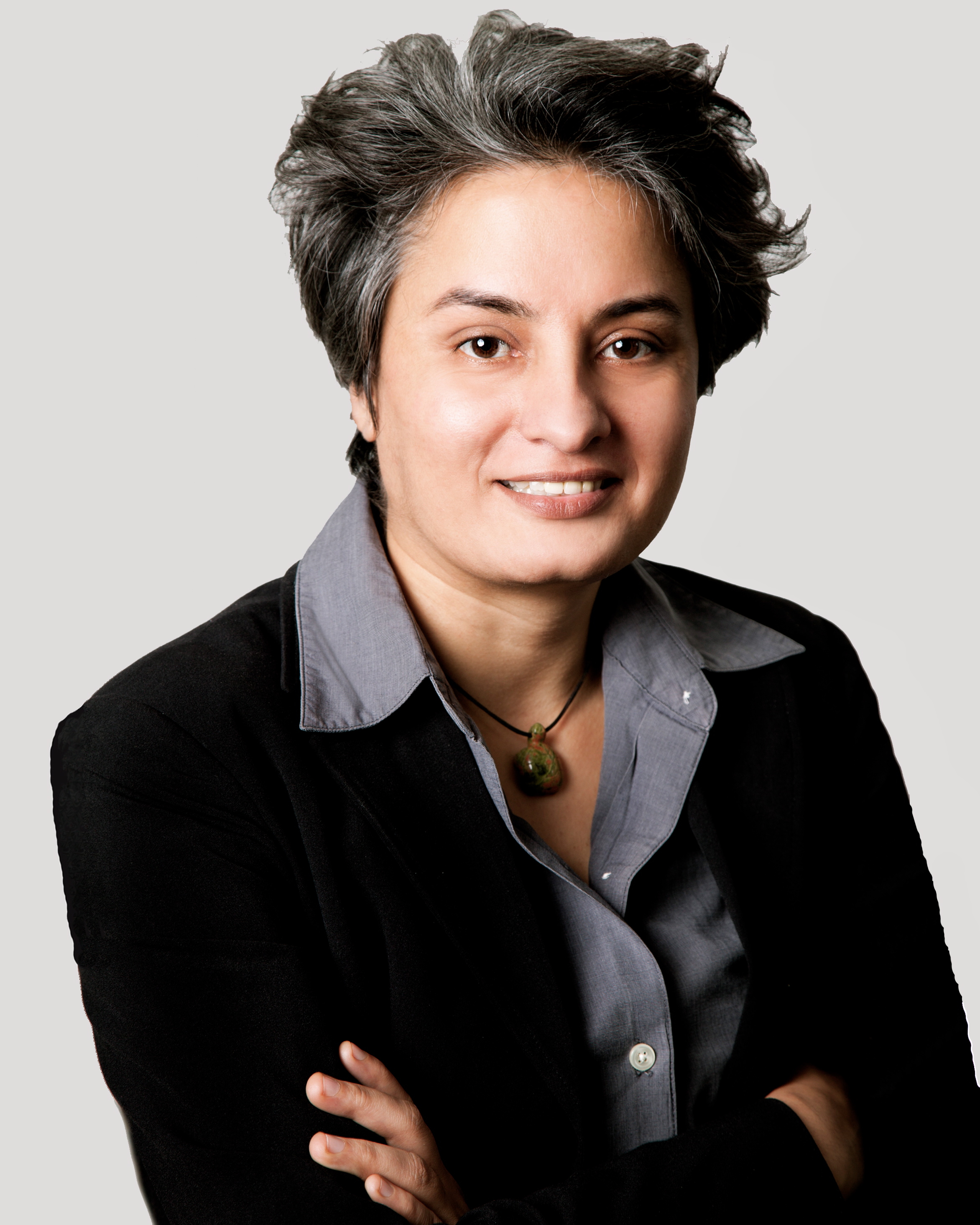
- Occupation: Stand-up comedian
- Website: www.vasuprimlani.com

Ritu Vasu Primlani is an Indian stand-up comedian and environmentalist. She received the 2015 Nari Shakti Puraskar from the Government of India for her work.

== Personal life ==
Primlani grew up in New Delhi, India. She received a master's degree from UCLA in Geography, Urban Planning and Law.

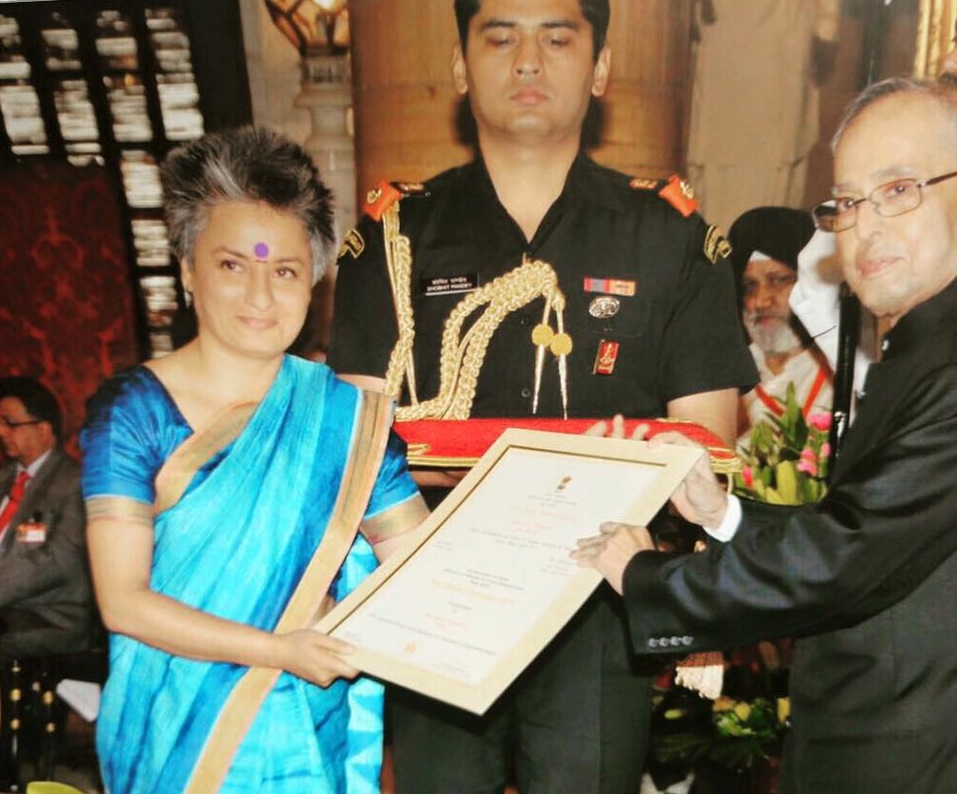
Vasu Primlani receiving the Nari Shakti award from the President of India.

She is also a fitness enthusiasts and has done five half marathons, two Olympic-distance triathlons, a Half Ironman and a sprint triathlon. Currently based out of Delhi, she is also a somatic therapist.

== Career ==
Primlani founded the non-profit Thimmakka’s Resources for Environmental Education in the United States. This organisation provided environmental consulting services for restaurants and it received the California Governors Environmental and Economic Leadership Award in 2003 and she was appointed an Ashoka Fellow for her work with restaurants. Ms. Primlani's organisation also received a US EPA region 9 award in 2003.

In July 2014, Primlani was accused of cheating by Saalumarada Thimmakka, a Bengaluru-based environmentalist, for using her name to solicit money from the United States. According to Thimmakka, Primlani was misusing her name when she set up the Thimmakka's Resources for Environmental Education in the United States. According to Primlani, Thimmakka, a centenarian, "supposedly" merely forgotten that she had given Primlani consent to use her name.

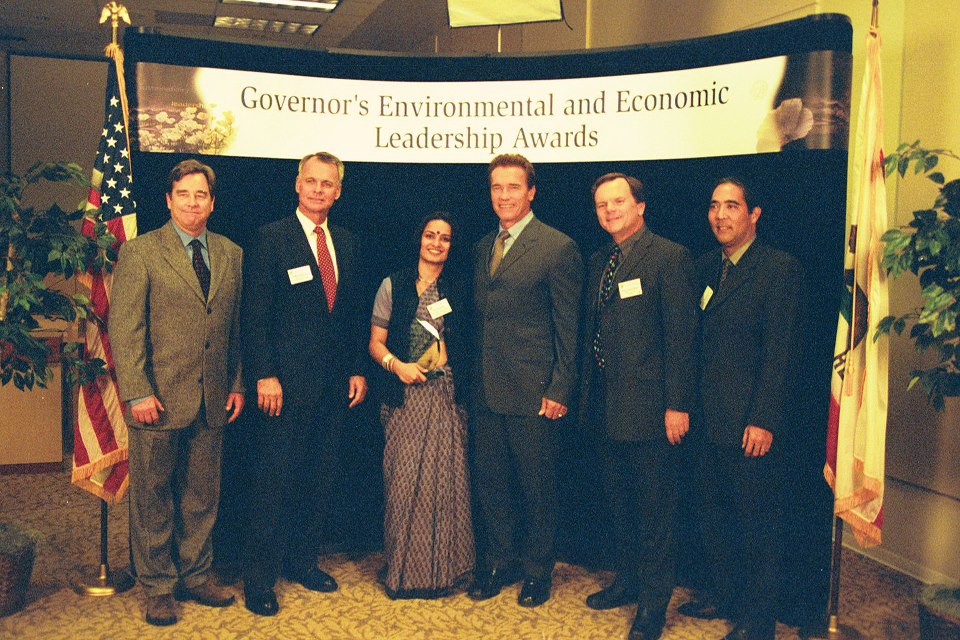
Ritu Vasu Primlani receiving an award from the Governor of California

Primlani has produced, headlined in, and performed in hundreds of corporate and comedy club shows across the world, including in New York City, San Francisco, Mumbai, Dubai, Bengaluru, Hyderabad, Chandigarh, Pune, and Delhi. She tackles social messaging through her comedy, giving voice to daring issues such as the environment, human rights, and rape

In 2024, she released her first graphic novel, JUTA in New Delhi, India and started working as Knoxville's new sustainability director

== Awards ==
- Nari Shakti Award, 2015, by the Government of India
- Global Ashoka Innovators for the Public Social Entrepreneur fellowship 2004
- U.S. EPA Region 9 Environmental Achievement Award 2003
- California Governor’s Environmental and Economic Leadership Award 2003
