= Daroji Eramma =

Indian folk artist of Burrakatha art

- Born: 1930
- Died: 12 August 2014 (aged 83–84); Bellary, Karnataka, India
- Other name: Burrakatha Eeramma
- Occupations: Folk singer and performer
- Known for: Burra katha

Daroji Eramma, popularly known as Burrakatha Eeramma (1930 – 12 August 2014) was a folk singer and performer of the Burrakatha, a folk art form of epic storytelling from South India. She was awarded several awards including the Rajyotsava Prashasti in 1999.

== Life ==
Eramma was born in 1930 in a family from the semi-nomadic Buduga Janagama community, a scheduled caste tribe. She learnt the Burrakatha from her father Lalappa as a young adolescent, and had taught this folk art form to the members of her family and community.

Though illiterate, Eramma could perform twelve folk epics from memory, which amounts to 200,000 sentences and 7,000 pages in print. These folk epics include Kumararama, Babbuli Nagireddi, Baala Nagamma, Jaisingaraaja Kavya and Bali Chakravarthi Kavya.

Her performances often lasted for days, accompanied by her sister, Shivamma, and her sister-in-law, Parvathamma on percussion, while Eramma herself would play a stringed instrument with one hand and bells with the other. She had participated in the awareness campaigns on and polio vaccination.

She died on 12 August 2014 at Bellary in Karnataka. Her last rites were performed at her native village Daroji in Sandur Taluka of Bellary district.

== Recognition ==
Daroji Eramma received the Rajyotsava Prashasti in 1999 as well as Dr. Babasaheb Ambedkar Award instituted by Government of Karnataka. She was awarded the Sandesha Arts Award in 2003 for her contribution to arts and folklore. The Department of Tribal Studies, Kannada University, Hampi felicitated her with the Nadoja Award in 2003. Prasar Bharati awarded her the Best Folk Artiste Award in 2010. She received the Janapada Shri for 2010 in 2012.

A student of Hampi University, L. Sarikadevi, wrote her 2006 doctoral thesis on Eramma, which helped to popularise Eramma and her practice. Some of her performances have been recorded and published by Chalavaraju, a scholar of intangible heritage based at the Kannada University.
