= Humr =

Ethnic group in Sudan

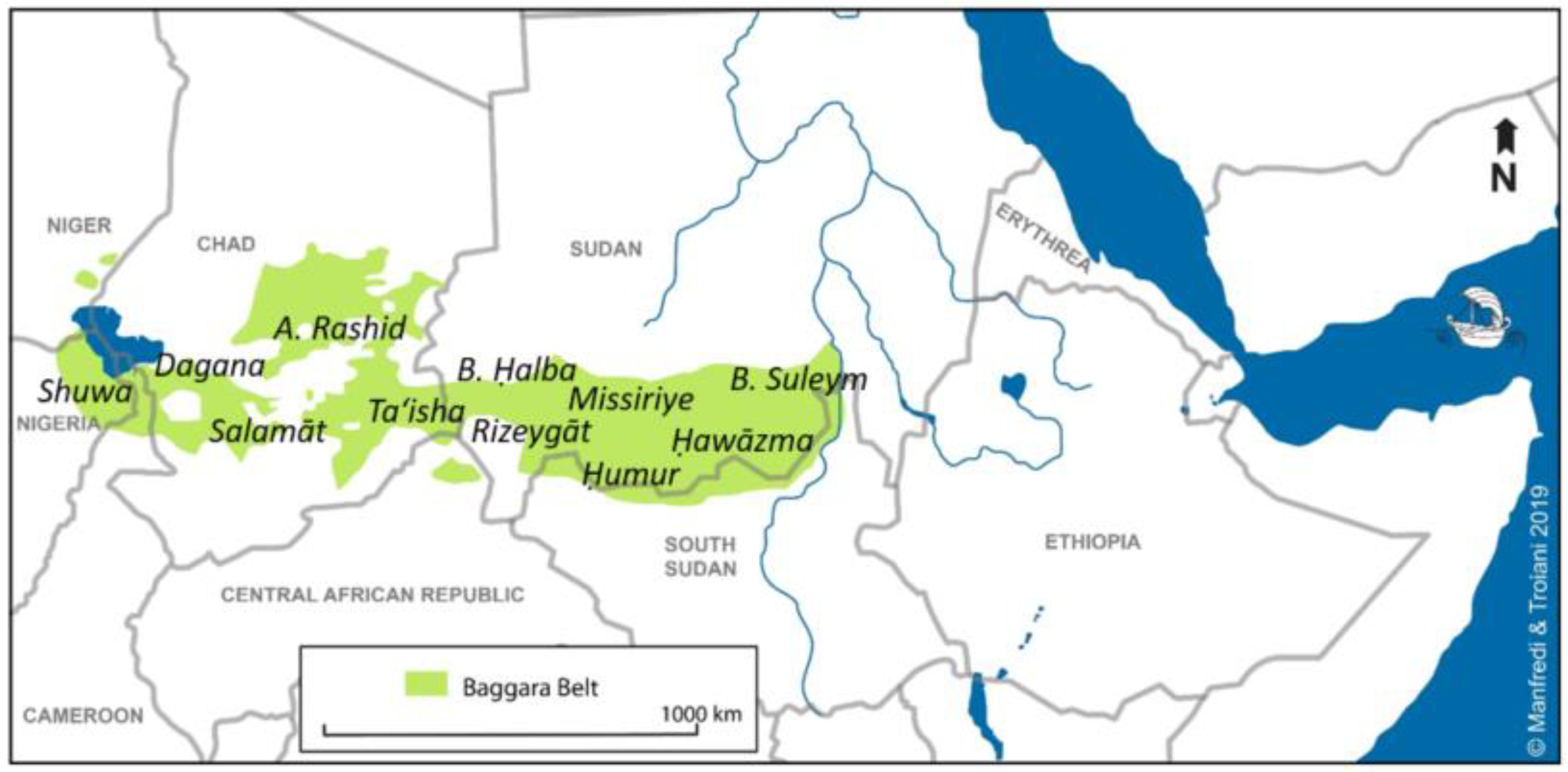
The belt of territory, spanning primarily Chad and Sudan, inhabited by tribes within the Baggara grouping. The territory of the Humr lies in the eastern part of this belt in the Kordofan region of Sudan.

The Humr (also known as Humur, Arabic: همور, romanized: Hūmūr, lit. 'red') are one of two branches of the Messiria, a subgroup of the Baggara ethnic group, native to the south-west province of Kordofan, Sudan. Speakers of Chadian Arabic, the Humr live in the area surrounding the towns of Babanusa, Muglad and Al Fula (Arabic: الفولة).

The Humr are divided into two groups - the Ajaira, who live in the area from Muglad to Abyei and the Felaita, who live in the vicinity of Babanusa, Alfoula and Kajira. There are six clans in the Ajaira and five in the Falita, and thus twelve Humrawi clans in all. Anthropologist Ian Cunnison lists the clans of the two divisions of the Humr as the Ajaira consisting of the Fayyarin, Awlád Kamil, Mezaghna, Fadliya, Menama and Addal clans, and the Felaita consisting of the Metanin, Ziyud, Awlád Serur, Jubarat and Salamat clans.

The people who govern each tribe are known as the "Nazir" (Arabic: ناظر, lit. 'leader').

== Hunting ==
The Humur are intrepid hunters of elephants and the giraffe. Humrawi hunters' main reason for hunting the giraffe is the preparation of the drink umm nyolokh.

== umm nyolokh ==
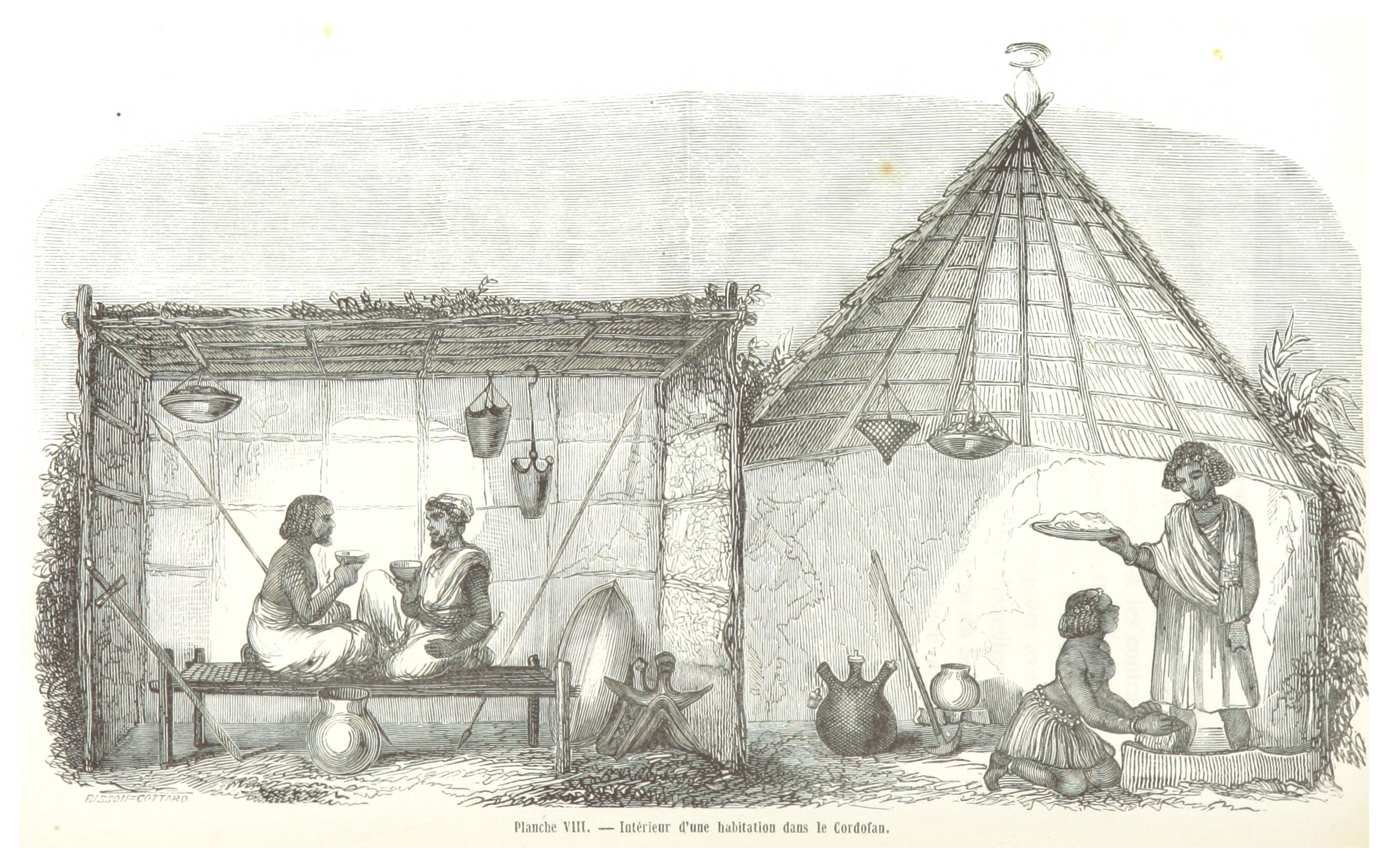
Domestic scene, circa 1850, showing men drinking, in Kordofan, home to the Humr tribe.

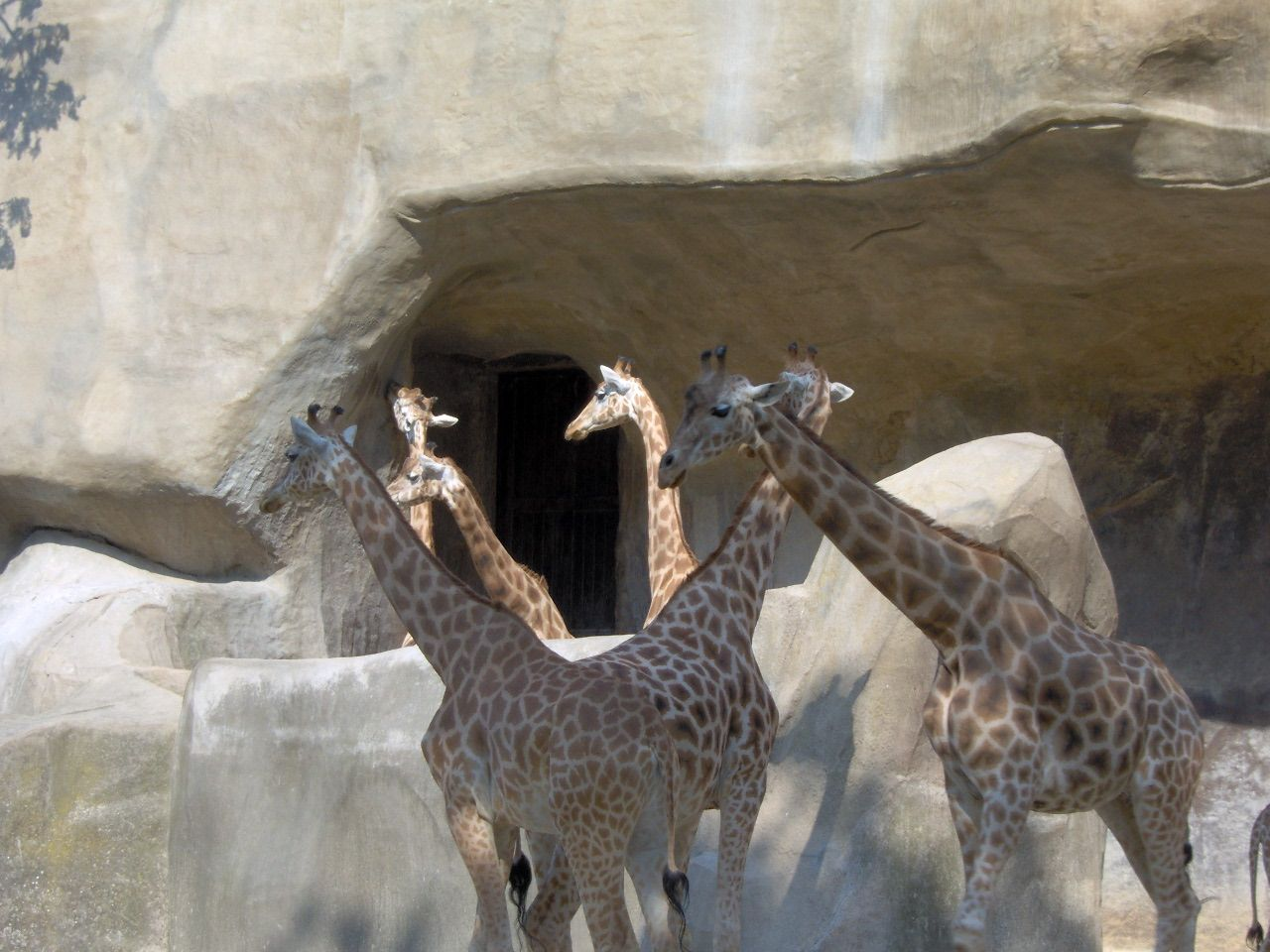
The Kordofan giraffe, one of the subspecies of giraffe hunted by the Humr.

The Humur are most commonly known outside the Sudan as the preparers of a drink made from the liver and bone marrow of a giraffe, which they call umm nyolokh, and which they claim is intoxicating, causing dreams and hallucinations. If substantiated by a chemical analysis, this claim would make the giraffe the first mammal to be discovered to contain a hallucinogen in its bodily tissues, and the Humrawi the first people to have discovered the existence of such a mammal. Ian Cunnison, who accompanied the Humr on some of their giraffe-hunting expeditions in the late 1950s, noted that:

It is said that a person, once he has drunk umm nyolokh, will return to giraffe again and again. Humr, being Mahdists, are strict abstainers [from alcohol] and a Humrawi is never drunk (sakran) on liquor or beer. But he uses this word to describe the effects which umm nyolokh has upon him.

Cunnison's account of a psychoactive mammal found its way into a mainstream literature through a conversation between Dr. Wendy James of the Institute of Social and Cultural Anthropology at the University of Oxford and specialist on the use of hallucinogens and intoxicants in society Richard Rudgley, who considered its implications in his popular work The Encyclopedia of Psychoactive Substances. Rudgley hypothesises that the presence of the hallucinogenic compound DMT might account for the putative intoxicating properties of umm nyolokh.
