= T. Sunandamma =

Indian writer and humorist

- Born: 1917; Tumkur, India
- Died: 27 January 2006 (aged 88–89)
- Occupation: Writer
- Writing career
- Genre: Comic

Tumkur Sunandamma (born Tumkur, 1917 – died Bangalore, 27 January 2006) was an Indian writer and humorist in the Kannada language. She was a recipient of the Karnataka Sahitya Academy Award.

== Early life ==
Sunandamma was born in Tumkur, Mysore in 1917. She belonged to a distinguished family of the Kingdom of Mysore, her father T. Ramaiah being a senior civil servant.

Despite social strictures against the education of girls at the time, she studied up to high school. The lone girl in her class, she outperformed the boys, leading to considerable pressure from their parents to have her removed from the school. She was married off at the age of 11.

== Career ==
Sunandamma began writing poetry for a children's magazine, Makkala Pustaka, while still a child. At the age of 25, her articles began to appear in the newly established humour magazine Koravanji, receiving critical praise.

When she moved to Bangalore, her observations of the middle-class lives of her neighbours, in particular the women of Basavangudi, began to inform her writings. They were lauded as potent and pungent.

Sunandamma wrote radio plays for All India Radio. Several of her works were adapted by others for the theatre. All's well, an English reworking from a Kannada play by Sundar based on Sunandamma's short story Aadaddella Olithe…? was directed Pramod Shiggaon and presented in 2008. Heegadre hege? written by K. Y. Narayana Swamy and directed by Pramod Shiggaon, was performed in Bangalore in October 2011.

== Honours ==
Sunandamma was the first writer to receive the Daana Chintamani Attimabbe Award in 1995 by Karnataka Government. In 1979, Sunandamma was elected the first president of the Karnataka Lekhakiyara Sangha (Karnataka Women Writers' Association). She received the Karnataka Sahitya Academy Award in 1981. In 2004, she was awarded the Anupama Prasasti, a literary award from the Karnataka Women Writers' Association.

== Selected works ==
- Jambhada cheela
- Bannada chitte
- Pepparamentu
- Muttina chenda
- Ruuddi gaadi
- Vriksha vahana
- Nanna attegiri
- Dr M. Shivaram – a biography
- Tenali Ramakrishnan – a children's biography
- Samaya Sindu
- Kanyamanigalige Kanthupithana Daye. ISBN 978-81728-6577-1.
- Y. N. Gundu Rao, ed. (2006). Best of Sunandamma. Ankita.
