= Sara Aboobacker =

Indian writer (1936–2023)

- Born: 30 June 1936; Kasaragod, South Canara, Madras Presidency, British India (now Kerala, India)
- Died: 10 January 2023 (aged 86); Mangalore, Dakshina Kannada, Karnataka, India
- Occupations: Writer and translator
- Writing career
- Language: Kannada

Sara Aboobacker (30 June 1936 – 10 January 2023) was an Indian Kannada writer of novels and short stories, and a translator.

== Early life and education ==
Sara was born in Kasaragod, Kerala on 30 June 1936, to Pudiyapuri Ahmad and Zainabi Ahmad. She had four brothers. She was one of the first girls in her community of Muslim families in Kasaragod to be educated, graduating from a local Kannada school. She was married after school, and went on to have four sons. Aboobacker once stated that her desire to further her education was constrained by community norms that restricted female access to higher education, and that she was only able to obtain a library membership in 1963.

== Career ==
=== As a writer ===
==== Writing style and themes ====
Sara's books largely focus on the lives of Muslim women living in the Kasaragod region, bordering the Indian states of Kerala and Karnataka. She focuses on issues of equality and injustice within her community, critiquing patriarchal systems within religious and familial groups. Her writing style is direct and simple, and she has stated that she prefers a realist approach to literature, prioritizing the expression of social concerns over stylistic embellishments. Her books have dealt with complex subjects such as marital rape, communal and religious violence, and individual autonomy.

==== Published works and adaptations ====
In 1981, Aboobacker published her first article, an editorial on communal harmony, in a local monthly Kannada-language magazine, Lankesh Patrike. Following this she began writing stories and novels, focusing on her own community, the Beary people, a Muslim community living across parts of the Indian states of Karnataka and Kerala.

Aboobacker is most well-known for her first novel, Chandragiriya Theeradalli (1981), which was later translated into English by Vanamala Vishwanatha as Breaking Ties and into Marathi by Shivarama Padikkal in 1991. The novel was initially published in serialised form in a local monthly magazine, Lankesh Patrike, and later republished as a novel. It focuses on the life of Nadira, a young Muslim woman attempting to assert independence first from her father, and later, from her husband. Chandragiriya Theeradalli has been adapted for the theatre, with a script written by Roopa Koteshwar being produced in 2016. In 2019, a district court ruled in favour of Aboobacker in a suit she had filed for copyright infringement against the makers of the film Byari. The film had won the Swarna Kamal Award at the 59th National Film Festival in 2011. The District Court found that it was based primarily on Aboobacker's book, Chandragiriya Theeradalli and that the producers had not obtained her permission to adapt the book for their film.

Her novel, Vrajagalu (1988) is currently being made into a film produced by Devendra Reddy, titled Saaravajra. The film stars actress Anu Prabhakar Mukherjee as the protagonist, Nafisa, and traces her life from childhood to old age, as she navigates marriage, and divorce within the Muslim community in Kasargod.

From 1994, Aboobacker has been publishing her works under her own publication company, Chandragiri Prakashan.

=== As a translator ===
Aboobaker has translated into Kannada books by T. V. Eachara Warrier, Kamala Das and B. M. Suhara.

== Awards and honours ==
Aboobacker has received a number of awards for her contributions to literature.

- In 1984, she received the Karnataka Sahitya Akademi Award.
- In 1987, she received the Anupama Niranjana Award.
- From 1990 to 1994, she served as president of a local writers' association, the Karavali Lekhakiyara mattu Vachakiyara Sangha.
- In 1995, she received the Kannada Rajyotsava Award.
- In 1996, she received the Rathnamma Heggade Mahila Sahitya Award.
- Daana Chintamani Attimabbe Award in 2001 by the Government of Karnataka
- In 2006, she received the Nadoja Award from Hampi University for her contributions to literature.
- In 2008, she was awarded an honorary doctorate from Mangalore University.
- In 2012, Nrupatunga Award for her contribution to Kannada literature.

== Literary works ==
=== Novels ===
- 1981 - Chandragiriya Teeradalli (Bengaluru: Patrike Prakasana, 1981. This was translated into English by Vanamala Vishwanatha as Breaking Ties (1982)
- 1985 - Sahana (Bengaluru: Chandragiri Prakashana)
- 1988 - Vajragalu (Bengaluru: Navakarnataka Prakasana)
- 1991 - Kadana Viraama
- 1994 - Suliyalli Sikkavaru (Bengaluru: Chandragiri Prakashana, 2013)
- 1997 - Tala Odeda Doniyali (Directorate Of Kannada And Culture)
- 2004 - Panjara

=== Short story collections ===
- 1989 - Chappaligalu (Bengaluru: Chandragiri Prakashana)
- 1992 - Payana
- 1996 - Ardha Ratriyalli Huttida Kusu
- 1999 - Kheddah
- 2004 - Sumayya
- 2007 - Gaganasakhi

=== Translations (from Malayalam to Kannada) ===
- 1992 - Manomi by Kamala Das
- 1998 - Bale by B.M. Sohara
- 2000 - Naninnu Nidrisuve by P. K. Balakrishnan
- 2009 - Dharmada Hesarinalli by R.B. Srikumar

=== Non-fiction ===
- 2010 - Hottu Kanthuva Munna (an autobiography)
