= Taridalu =

Village in Chickballpur District

- Village
- Location in Karnataka, India Taridalu (India)
- Coordinates: 13.4847596°N 77.4374612°E
- Country: India
- State: Karnataka
- District: Chikkaballapura
- Talukas: Gauribidanur
- Elevation: 707 m (2,320 ft)

Population (2011)
  - Total: 3,208

Languages
  - Official: Kannada
- Time zone: UTC+5:30 (IST)
- PIN: 561210
- Telephone code: 08155
- Vehicle registration: KA 40
- Lok Sabha constituency: Chikballapur (Lok Sabha constituency)

Taridalu is a village in the southern state of Karnataka, India. It is located in the Gauribidanur taluk of Chikkaballapura district in Karnataka. It is situated 27 km away from sub-district headquarter of Gauribidanur and 38 km away from district headquarter, Chikkaballapura.

== Demographics ==
According to Census 2011 information the location code or village code of Taridalu village is 623363. Taridalu village is also a gram panchayat. Villages that come under Taridalu gram Panchayat are Veerammanahalli, Taridalu, Somashattyhalli, Nachakunte and Dyavasandra.

The total geographical area of village is 597.93 hectares. Taridalu has a total population of 1,718 peoples with 873 males and 845 females. There are about 442 houses in Taridalu village. Gauribidanur is nearest town to Taridalu which is approximately 27 km away.

== Economy ==
People belonging to the Taridalu village grow maize, millet silk, areca nuts, Ragi, marygold, pumpkins, tuberose etc. The major occupations of the residents of Taridalu are dairy farming. The dairy cooperative is the largest individual milk supplying cooperative in the state.

== Facilities ==
Taridalu has below types of facilities.

- Government higher primary School
- Taridalu KMF (Karnataka Milk Federation) Dairy
- Taridalu Gram Panchayat Office
- Post Office
- Gram Panchayat Library

== Temples ==
- Shanimahathma Swamy Temple
- Ganesha temple
- Anjenayya Temple
- Chowdeshwari Amma Temple
- Kannika Parameswari Amma Temple
- Eshwara swamy Temple
- Basavanna Temple
- Ayyappa swamy Temple
- Maramma Thayi Temple
