= Hampanā =

Indian academician and writer

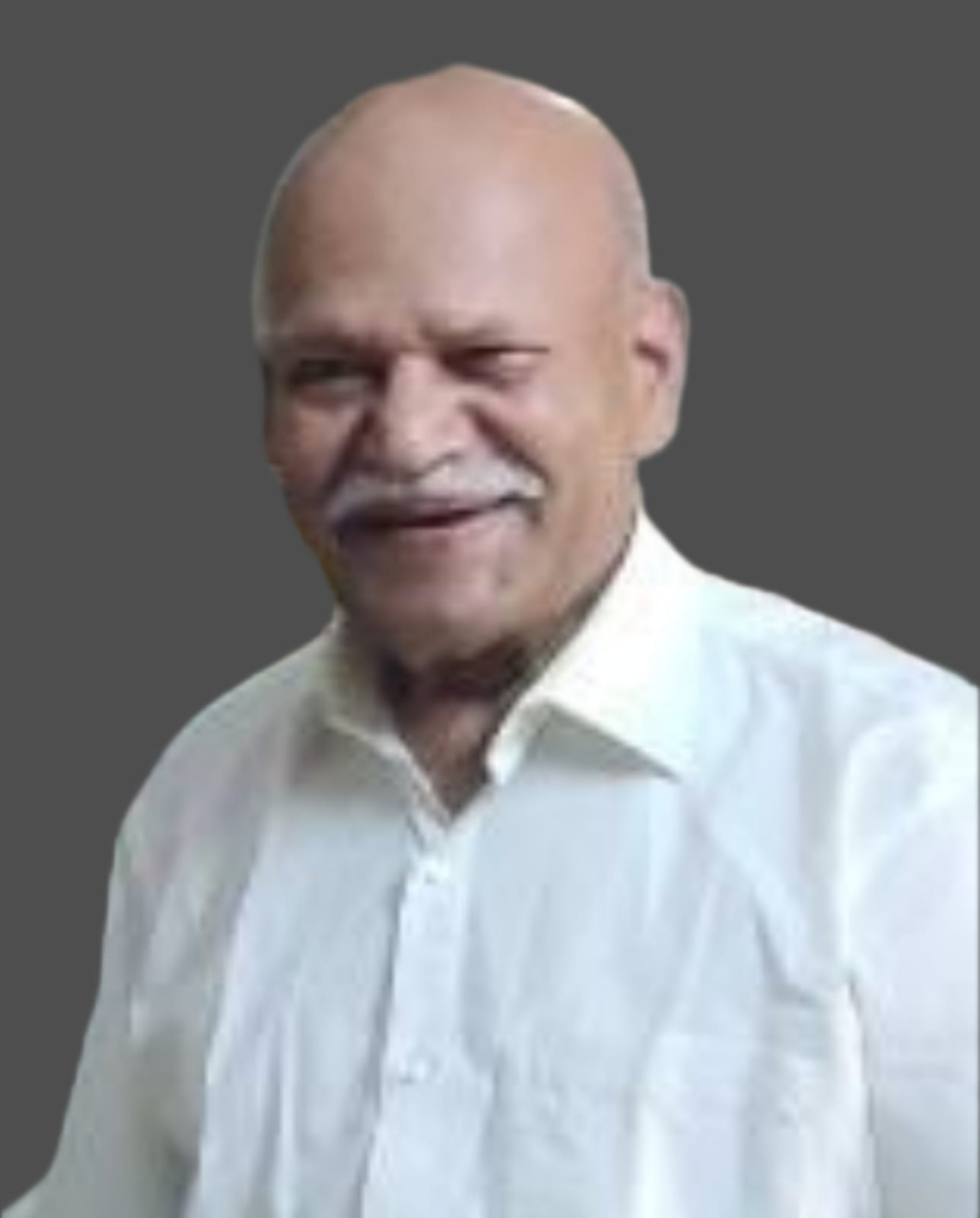
- Born: Hampa Nagarajayya; 7 October 1936 (age 90); Hampasandra Gauribidanur taluk, Chikkaballapura district, Karnataka, India
- Occupation: Professor
- Writing career
- Pen name: Hampana
- Subjects: Kannada Literature and Jainism

Hampa Nagarajaiah (born 7 October 1936), known by his pen name Hampanā, is an Indian scholar in Kannada language and Jainism. He was born at Hampasandra Village located in Gowribidanur taluk, Chikkaballapura District in the Indian state of Karnataka. He has served as a professor, administrator, and literary organizer in Karnataka and has been associated with several academic and cultural institutions.

== Academics ==
Hampanā completed his early education in his native village and neighbouring towns such as Gowribidanur, Madhugiri, Tumkur and Mandya. Later he moved to Maharaja's College, Mysore from where he graduated with a BA (Honours) and completed his post-graduation in Kannada under the guidance of Kuvempu, T. N. Srikantaiah, D. L. Narasimhachar, S.V. Parameshwara Bhatta, K Venkataramappa and D.Javaregowda He was awarded a Ph.D. by Bangalore University for his thesis titled "A Comprehensive study of Vaddaradhane" a critical study of one of the earliest extant works of Kannada prose.

== Academic career ==
Hampanā began his career as a lecturer in Kannada. He served at Maharani's Arts and Commerce College for Women, Mysore, Sahyadri Science College, Shimoga, Government College at Mandya, DRM Science College at Davanagere and Govt. Arts & Science College at Bengaluru.

At Bengaluru University, he held positions including Professor and Dean of the Faculty of Arts. He also served as Director of the Jain Research Centre, the Institute of Jain Studies, and Department of Kannada and Culture in Government of Karnataka. He retired from Government service in 1996.

== KaSaPa Secretary ==
He served as an honorary secretary of the Kannada Literary Chair called Kannada Sahitya Parishat from 1966 to 1974 and was elected as its president for three terms from 1978–1986. During his tenure, about 300 books in Kannada authored by various scholars were published under the Parishat's auspices. In 1979 declared by UNESCO as the International Year of the Child Parishat published around 200 books for children by different writers. He has played a role in construction of a building commemorating the Golden Jubilee of Kannada Saahithya Parishath.

== Lectures ==
Hampanā has delivered guest lectures on Jainism at universities in UK, Germany and United States. He has also delivered lectures on linguistics, poetics and Jain literature at Bengaluru University, Mysore University, Mangalore University, Karnataka University, Kuvempu University, Mumbai University, Madras University and Madhurai Kamaraj University. He is a visiting professor in many Universities and is serving as an honorary member of the advisory committee at London University, England and Florida International University, US.

== Felicitation volumes ==
Several volumes have been presented to him by his students and admirers on various occasions. These volumes contain articles of significant scholastic importance. They include:

- Pachethene (in 1983) Ed: T K Mahamood and S M Krishnaraya
- Samkriti (in 1988) Ed: D. H J Lakkappa Gowda and Prof. Sukanya Maruthi
- Samkarshana (in 1996) Ed: J Jnanananda & Dr. Sanjeev K Shetty
- Baraha baagina (in 1997) Ed: H V Nagesh
- HamGranthavali (in 1997) (A compendium of his works) Ed: Smitha Reddy & Tamil Selvi
- Hampanā Vangmaya (in 2007) (Another compilation of his works) Ed: Dr. M Bhyregowa & B R Sathyanarayana
- Svasti (in 2010) Ed:Prof. Nalini Balbir, University of Paris

== Awards ==
Hampanā is conferred with many awards. The most recent is the Naadoja Award (Teacher of the Land) conferred by Kannada University in 2006. The Acharya Sri Mahaprajna Jain Sahitya award, constituted by Jain Shwetambar Terapanth Sabha, was conferred on litterateur Dr. Hampa Nagarajaiah., consisting of a cash of Rs. 51,000 and a memento, on 13 July 2008. The Jain World Foundation USA has awarded him the prestigious ‘Jewel of Jain World’ award on Mahaveer Nirvana day of 2013. This award is given to select few who have dedicated their life to serve the cause of Jainism and made significant contribution to propagate Jainism globally and enhance visibility of Jainism worldwide.

Additionally, he received the Karnataka Sahitya Academy award in 1993–94, the Janapada Yakshagana Academy award in 1995, the National award for the best child literature in 1990, the Chavundaraya award in 1996, the Kavyananda award in 1997, the Karnataka Rajyotsava award in 1998, the Sham Baa Joshi award in 2000, and the Shasana Sahitya award and Chi Na Mangala awards in 2001. Hampanā is felicitated by the monasteries such as Nidumamidi Matha, Sringeri Matha, Chitradurga Brihanmatha, Savalagi Matha, Shravanabelagola Matha, Moorusavira Matha and Ilakal Mahantesha Matha for his contribution towards religion and literature.

He also received the KundKund Gyanpeeth award at Indore, the Babulal Amrithlal Sha Gold Medal at Ahmedabad and the Acharya Sumathi Sagar award from Sonagiri in Madhya Pradesh for his significant contribution to Jain literature. The civic societies of India and Shimoga have honored him with the titles "Sahitya Sindhu" in 1997 and "Jnanabhaskara" in 2001. In 2016 Hampanā was awarded with the Pampa Prashasti instituted by the Government of Karnataka. Recognising his contributions towards the classical Kannada, he was honored with the President's Certificate by the Ministry of Human Resource of the Union Government of India.

== Charu Vasantha ==
Starting from Pampa, the Kannada literary world has seen many great epics. During the last one century it has seen a greatest number of epics. Among them are Sri Ramayana Darshanam of Kuvempu, Bharatha Sindhu Rashmi of Vinayaka Krishna Gokak, Bhavyamaanava of S. S. Bhoosnurmath. The poet Latha Rajashekhara has composed three epics on Jesus, Basava and Budha, a greatest achievement in one's lifetime.

Charu Vasantha is another great epic and is unique in its exposition in the history of Kannada literature. It is a romance story of Charu Datta a Jain merchant and Vasanta Tilake, the harlot with astounding beauty. He was jolted with his affluent property to her and lost the glory of his profession. However, he works hard and regains everything he had lost.

Meanwhile impressed by his attitude, Vasanta Tilake marries him. The caste and creed does not play any role in their union. Mitravati who is already leading a married life with Charudatta, willfully accepts his marriage with Vasantha Tilake. Even his mother endorses this wedding. The story is folk type and characters appear befitting to it. This classic also emphasises the earthly flavours and also one's final abode. Hampana has knitted this present intricate but narrative theme in its desi style, which also amalgamates the meters of Ragale, Champu, Shatpadi and alienated styles of prosody in Kannada. A few of the words which have become oblivion have been revived in this classic, denoting Hampana's linguistic erudition. The roots of this fascinating chronicle are deep with their niche in early medieval poetry. The multidimensional multi-layered story has journeyed for over two millennia and finally found its rebirth in Charu Vasantha. The poem is radical and secular, with not a whiff of intolerance or hatred towards other religions or way of life.

This work is translated into many other languages such as Rajasthani, Banjara, Telugu, Oriya, Bengali, German, Gujarati, Hindi, Kashmiri, Marathi, Prakrit, Punjabi, Sanskrit, Urdu and English. Alva's Center for Theatrical Studies in Moodabidri, under the direction of Jeevan Ram Sulya has enacted Charuvasantha in houseful theatres at Moodabidri, Mysuru, Bengaluru, Davanagere, Chitradurga, Gauribidanur, Tumakuru, Sulya and Dharwar.

== On Kannada ==
Hampana's scholarship in Kannada is most significantly depicted in his work called Spectrum of Classical Literature in Kannada which gives a sporadic illustration of Kannada language, culture and tradition in 5 volumes. He is one among the very few who are proficient in Ancient form of Kannada, popularly known as Halagannada. He can speak in authority on Jainism and Jain Vastu. In his volume he emphasizes how the Jain epics influenced the growth of Kannada. With a proficiency in Kannada and Jainology, his mastery over English, Sanskrit and Prakrit made him recognized by the universities round the globe. Prof Hampana in his latest work "Spectrum of Classical Literature in Karnataka-5" gives a sporadic illustration of the Kannada language and poetics.
