= Wooday P. Krishna =

Indian educationist and social activist

Nadoja Dr. Wooday P. Krishna
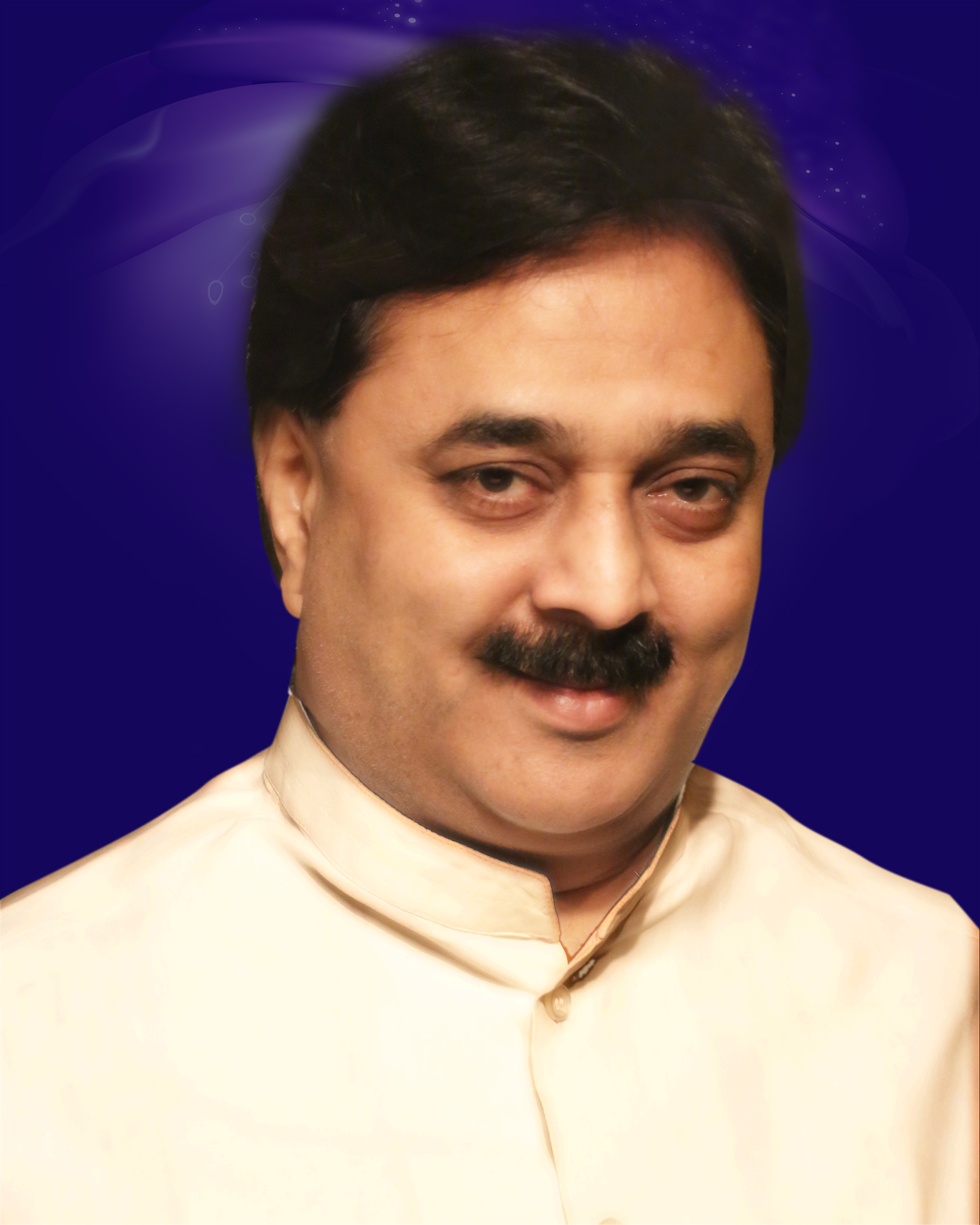
- Born: Bengaluru, Karnataka
- Education: Sri Ramkrishna Vidyashala, Mysuru
- Occupations: Educationist; technocrat; social activist
- Spouse: Dr.G.Savitha
- Website: www.woodaypkrishna.in

Wooday P. Krishna is an Indian educationist, technocrat and social activist. Krishna is also the Honorary General Secretary of Seshadripuram Educational Trust, President, Karnataka Gandhi Smarak Nidhi, Former Chairman Gandhi Peace Foundation and former Chairman, The Institution of Engineers (India), Karnataka State Centre. He has served as a member of State Disaster Management Authority, Government of Karnataka in the rank of Minister of State, to develop proactive mitigating strategies for any disasters in the State.

Krishna is a recipient of the President’s Gold Medal, the highest National Award given for Red Cross humanitarian work of high order in 2012 from the Honourable President of India and the prestigious State Rajyotsava Award in 2004 for social work from the Government of Karnataka. He has been elected Fellow, World Academy of Productivity Science, Canada in recognition of his contributions to productivity improvement in the delivery of humanitarian services. In 2020 he has been conferred with the prestigious Nadoja Award which is equivalent to Honorary degree of Doctor of Literature (D.Litt.) by Kannada University, Hampi. He has been nominated as a Member of the Dr. H. Narasimhaiah Scientific, Educational, Cultural and Tourism Development Authority by the Government of Karnataka in 2025.

== Early and personal life ==
Krishna was born in 1963 in Bangalore, Karnataka to father Late W. H. Puttiah, a merchant and freedom fighter and mother Late Doddammaiya. He is married to Dr.G.Savitha. Krishna attended Sri Ramkrishna Vidyashala in Mysuru; and is a Doctorate (Ph.D) in Management' and a post-graduate in Engineering, Law, Sociology and Journalism. At school he was influenced by the principles of Swami Vivekananda and later by Raja Rammohun Roy.

== Career ==
Krishna is a well-known and nationally recognized educationist. He has provided leadership to the Seshadripuram Educational Trust (SET) that comprises 34 educational institutions spread across Bengaluru, Mysuru, Tumakuru and Mandya Districts and was established in 1930 by a group of women as a primary school named Seshadripuram Stree Samaja. He has been involved with Indian Red Cross Society, The Tuberculosis Association of India, Gandhi Peace Foundation, and The Institution of Engineers (India) at the national level; .

He was a Chartered Engineer for more than three decades, and he is also a technical arbitrator.

Krishna authored a book named Sir M Visvesvaraya Jeevana Sadhane that was released on National Science Day in 2009.

== Recognition ==
- 2002 – Kempegowda Award from Bangalore Mahanagara Palike for Education
- 2004 – State Rajyotsava Award from Government of Karnataka – for social work
- 2005 – Red Cross Award from the Honourable Governor of Karnataka – for humanitarian services
- 2011 – Eminent Engineer Award from The Institution of Engineers – for contribution in the field of Engineering.
- 2012 – President's Gold Medal from Honourable President of India for Red Cross humanitarian work
- 2014 – Fellowship of the Institution of Engineering and Technology, United Kingdom
- 2017 – The Doyen’s Award from the Hindu Group in recognition of his exemplary contribution to make education inclusive, and change the landscape of education in Karnataka
- 2020 – Honorary degree Nadoja by Kannada University, Hampi. Conferred the honorary degree by His Excellency Sri Vajubhai Rudabhai Vala, Governor of Karnataka and Chancellor of Kannada University, Hampi
- 2023 - Honorary Degree of Doctor of Letters (D. Lit.) from Bengaluru City University for Exceptional Service to Society.
- 2023 - Fellowship Award from the Karnataka Science & Technology Academy, Government of Karnataka, for Popularisation of Science
- 2025 - Samyama Award from Karnataka State Temperance Board, Government of Karnataka,

for exemplary contribution towards an addiction-free India.

- 2026 - Mahatma Gandhi Seva Award for Life Time Achivement in Social Service from Government of Karnataka.
- References

https://www.thehindu.com/news/cities/bangalore/wooday-p-krishna-conferred-ksta-fellowship-2023/article70121176.ece
