= Ian Cunnison =

British social anthropologist and academic (1923–2013)

- Born: 13 February 1923; Milngavie, Scotland
- Died: 16 June 2013
- Occupations: Anthropologist; professor; translator
- Years active: 1950s–1990s

Academic background
- Education: University of Cambridge; University of Oxford

Academic work
- Discipline: Sociology, anthropology
- Institutions: University of Khartoum; University of Hull; University of Manchester
- Main interests: Social anthropologist
- Notable works: The Luapula Peoples of Northern Rhodesia (1959); Baggara Arabs (1966)

Ian George Cunnison (13 February 1923 – 16 June 2013) was a Scottish social anthropologist and academic who specialised in the ethnography of Central and East Africa. Regarded as an influential figure in Sudanese anthropology, Cunnison served as the first Professor of Social Anthropology at the University of Khartoum in 1959.

Cunnison later served as the founding professor of social anthropology at the University of Hull in 1966 until his retirement in 1989. He is known for his anthropological work on the Humr tribe of Sudan, and on the people of the Luapula Valley in Northern Rhodesia (now Zambia). Cunnison also taught at the University of Manchester. Some of his major publications include The Luapula Peoples of Northern Rhodesia (1959), and Baggara Arabs (1966). Cunnison also translated Marcel Mauss's seminal sociological work, The Gift (1954), into English for the first time.

== Career ==
Born in Milngavie, Scotland, Cunnison graduated from the University of Cambridge and later completed a DPhil in anthropology at the University of Oxford. His doctoral research was on the peoples of the Luapula Valley in Northern Rhodesia (now Zambia) and was supported by the Rhodes-Livingstone Institute.

== Publications ==
- Cunnison, Ian George (1959). The Luapula peoples of northern Rhodesia. Manchester University Press.
- Cunnison, I. (1966). Baggara Arabs: Power and the Lineage in a Sudanese Nomad Tribe. Clarendon Press.
- Cunnison, Ian; James, W. (1972). Essays in Sudan Ethnography Presented to Sir Edward Evans-Pritchard. C. Hurst. ISBN 978-0-900966-54-5.
