= Kannada University =

Public university in Hampi, Karnataka, India

- Type: Public
- Established: 1991; 35 years ago
- Affiliations: UGC
- Chancellor: Governor of Karnataka
- Vice-Chancellor: Dr. D. V. Paramashivamurthy
- Location: Hampi, Karnataka, India; 15°17′3.4″N 76°29′22.7″E
- Campus: Rural
- Website: Official website

Kannada University, also called Hampi Kannada University, Hampi University, or Kannada University, Hampi, is a public research university in Hampi, Karnataka, founded in 1991 by the Government of Karnataka through the Kannada University Act, 1991, with the aim to develop the Kannada language and to promote the literature, traditions, culture, and folklore of Karnataka. It has its jurisdiction over state of Karnataka.

The university confers "Nadoja" awards, every year, which is equivalent to an Honorary Doctor of Literature (D.Litt.) degree. The award instituted by the university is given to eminent personalities for their contribution in various fields.
