= Anke Gowda =

Indian bibliophile and library founder

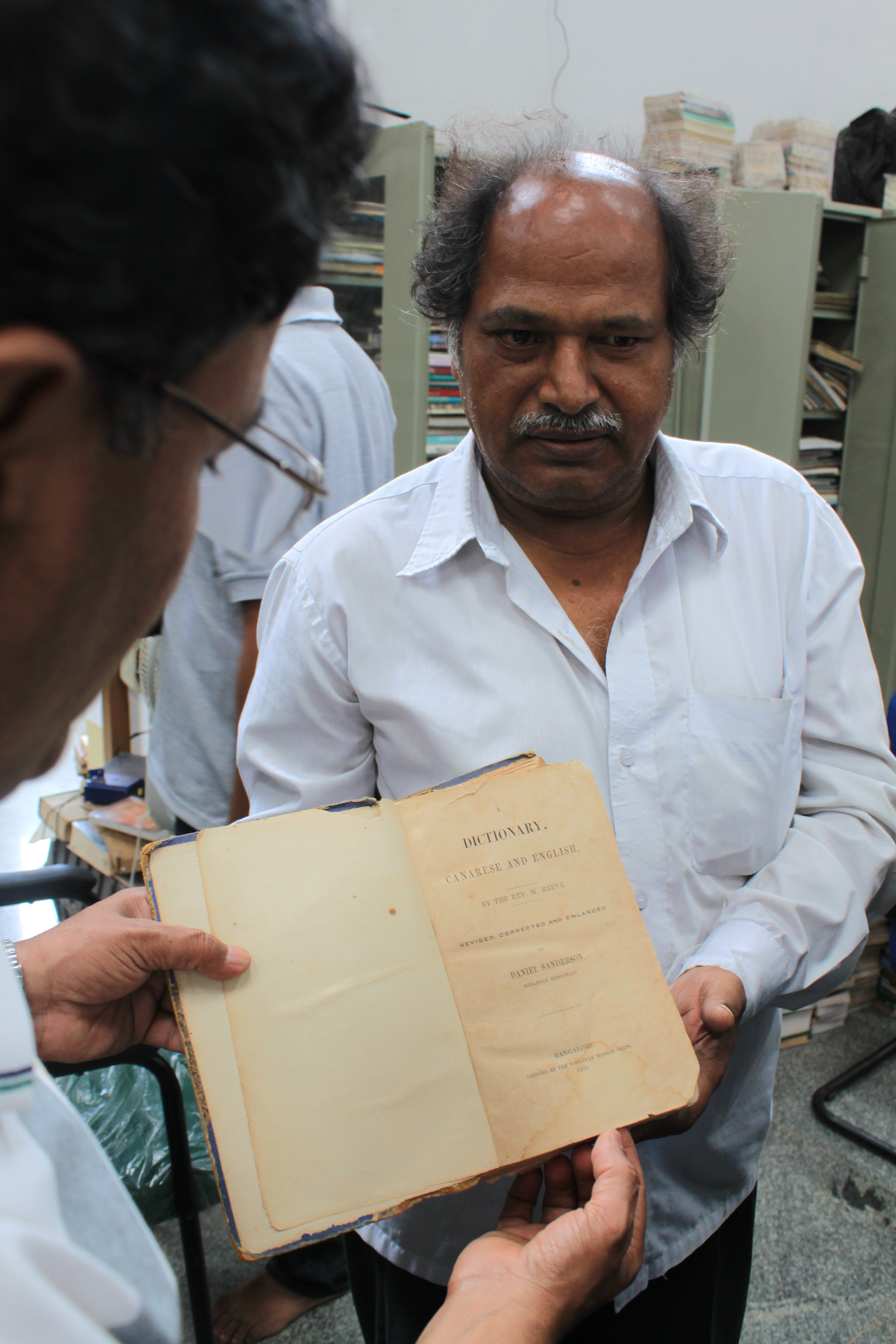
- Gowda in 2012
- Born: c. 1947 (age 78–79); Chinakurli, Pandavapura, India
- Occupations: Timekeeper, book collector, and librarian
- Known for: Pustaka Mane library (founder)

Anke Gowda (born on 8/1/1949) is an Indian book collector and the founder of Pustaka Mane library in Mandya, India. He is a retired sugar factory timekeeper who once worked as a bus conductor. During the course of five decades, Gowda amassed a collection that is estimated to number over two million volumes, and has been described as one of the largest free-access personal libraries in India.

== Biography ==
Gowda was born to parents Mari Gowda and Ningamma, a family of farmers in the small village of Chinakurli in Pandavapura taluk. He began reading and collecting books as a child, beginning with works by Swami Vivekananda when he was still in class IX. He recalls that the people in his village were not accustomed to books, which got him thinking about how to make them more accessible. Gowda went on to earn a bachelor's degree, after which he took several jobs, including one as a bus conductor and another as a security guard.

He completed a master's in Kannada at Maharaja's College, Mysore, where he was influenced by his teacher K. Anantharamu, who memorably told his class, "Never seek bribes, be good to your neighbours and cultivate a good habit." This advice stuck with Gowda, leading him to develop the habit of book collecting seriously. He also began working as a timekeeper at the Pandavapura Cooperative Sugar factory, where he remained for nearly 30 years. He invested a large portion of his salary and retirement savings in collecting books. Gowda lives with his wife and their son in a corner of the Pustaka Mane library.

== Pustaka Mane ==
Gowda's book collection is housed in a library named "Pustaka Mane" (House of Books) in the Pandavapura municipality, Karnataka's Mandya district. It is a purpose-built nearly 1,500 square meter building, the construction of which was funded by Hari Khoday, who also funded the relocation and renovation of a local temple.

The collection, which spans a publication history of almost 200 years, includes science, technology, over 5,000 dictionaries, as well as literature, mythology, philosophy, religious texts, and rare books. Books about the Mahabharata, and texts related to Jainism, Buddhism, and Christianity are well represented, and there are several thousand books about Mahatma Gandhi and the Bhagavad Gita alone. The collection also includes 35,000 international magazines and 2,500 Kannada magazines and contains books and other publications in over 20 languages, including Kannada, Hindi, Tamil, and English.

The library is open to the public and is readily available to researchers. Bangalore artist and curator Shivanand Basavanthappa used the library to access 70-year-old copies of Chandamama, a magazine illustrated by M. T. V. Acharya. This research helped him curate the "Life and Art of MTV Acharya" exhibition at The Indian Institute of World Culture in 2025.

Notable visitors to the library include politicians Rahul Gandhi, Sadananda Gowda, and H. D. Kumaraswamy.

== Recognition ==
Gowda's work and commitment to making books available to the public has been recognised with various awards and honours. In 2009, he received the G. P. Rajarathnam Sahitya Paricharika Award from the Kannada Book Authority, followed by Alva's Nudisiri Award in 2011. He was also the recipient of the 2014 Rajyotsava Award, and received an entry for "Largest Personal Book Collection" in the 2016 Limca Book of Records. In 2026, the Indian government granted him a Padma Shri civilian award "for his extraordinary contribution to promoting literacy and learning."
