= Rowena Hill =

English writer, essayist, poet,

Rowena Hill (born in 1938) is a Welsh/English writer, essayist, poet, translator, scholar of Eastern cultures and retired university teacher. She is noted for writing in, and translating between, Italian, Spanish and English as well as for translating the work of well-known Venezuelan poets.

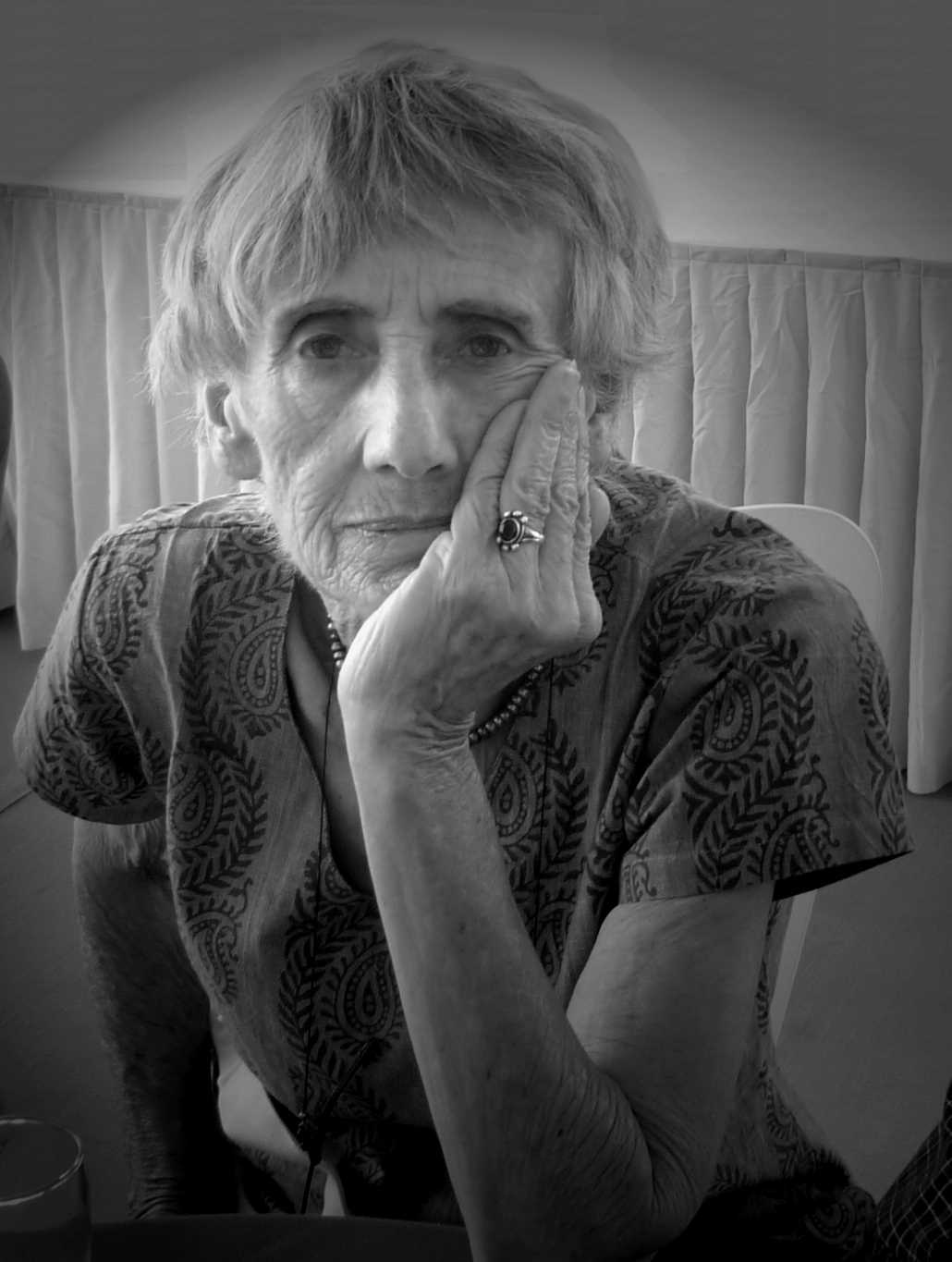
Rowena Hill at the Festival of Arts Beijing 2011

== Early life and education ==
Rowena Mary Hill was born in Cardiff in 1938. Her mother was Jean Hill and her father, Edward Hill. Her family emigrated from England to New Zealand when she was seven years old. She studied French and German at University and travelled around Europe after graduating.

== Career ==
In Italy, while translating the diaries of Bernard Berenson, she met Jose Fajardo, a Venezuelan sculptor. They lived together for some ten years and had two children, Andres, born in 1962, and Cecilia, born in 1963. After ending the relationship, Hill emigrated to Venezuela in 1975. Hill continued her translation work in Venezuela. She wrote articles for the Anima mundi column of the literary section of the El Universal newspaper. Her poems, essays and translations have appeared in Venezuelan, Colombian, Indian and US publications. She has written poems in Italian, Spanish and English, the ideas and words sometimes coming in one language, sometimes in another, so that she sometimes has two different language versions of the same poem. Hill taught English Literature at the Universidad de Los Andes in Mérida, Venezuela. She gained a university scholarship which she took in the south of India at the University of Mysore. On her return she published some translations of Indian writing.

Hill has been based in Venezuela for more than forty years. She has published five books of poems in Spanish and has translated into English the work of some of Venezuela's best known poets including Rafael Cadenas, Eugenio Montejo and Yolanda Pantin.

Three of Hill's own poems, translated by her into English can be read online. A short video of her reciting Las Flores is available online.

== Selected works ==
=== Publications ===
- Celebraciones (Universidad de Los Andes, ULA, 1981)
- Ida y Vuelta (ULA, 1987)
- Legado de Sombras (Monte Avila, 1997)
- Desmembramiento, (Taller TAGA, Caracas, 2002, with etchings by Adrián Pujol)
- No es tarde para alabar (Editorial Equinoccio, 2012)
- Planta baja del cerebro (Ediciones Actual, ULA, 2012)
- Marea Tardia (Alliteration LLC, 2023)

=== Translations ===
==== Into Spanish ====
- Nombres de Lo Innombrable (CONAC, 1991 2005)
- Selected metaphysical poetry originally in the Kannada language by Dalit or 'untouchable' poet Mudnakudu Chinnaswamy (CONAC, 2005) and Before it rains again (Erbacce Press 2016)
- Flores de tierra dura, Mujeres poetas del sur de la India (ULA, 2014) Women poets of south India.

==== Into English ====
- Perfiles de la noche/Profiles of Night (2006) Poetry written by women in Venezuela.
- Selected Poems/Poemas selectos by Rafael Cadenas (2009)
- The Blind Plain (Tavern Books, 2018), a bilingual edition of an anthology of the poetry of Igor Barreto. ISBN 978-1935635833
- The Farewell Light (Arrowsmith, 2024), a bilingual edition of poems by Nidia Hernandez of which reviewer Leonora Simonovis says "Hill executes an incredible rendering of these poems remaining faithful to the structure and line length...while allowing the author's choices to guide her translations." The translation was listed in World Literature Today's "75 notable translations of 2024".
