= KC Sivasankaran =

Indian artist (1924 – 2020)

K C Sivasankaran
- Born: Karatholuvu Chandrasekaran Sivasankaran; 19 July 1924; Karatholuvu, British Raj
- Died: 29 September 2020 (aged 96)
- Occupations: Artist, Painter
- Years active: 1946–2020
- Known for: Chandamama aka Ambulimama
- Notable work: Vikram and Vetala
- Awards: Padma Shri

Karatholuvu Chandrasekaran Sivasankaran (also known as KC Sivasankaran, Artist Sankar), (19 July 1924 – 29 September 2020) was a Padma Shri recipient Indian mythological artist who primarily contributed to the Indian Language magazine, Chandamama (also known as Ambulimama). Sankar was the artist behind the signature painting of the Vikram and Vetala series, featured in Chandamama. He was the last surviving member of the original Chandamama design team. The iconic painting, along with his trade-mark signature that he was recognized by, was drawn in the 1960s. It is one of the thousands he created for Chandamama. For decades, its illustrators defined the looks of the magazine. They used line drawings with style influenced by Indian, Oriental, Middle eastern and European artistic traditions.

== Early life ==
Sankar was born in a village near Erode in Tamil Nadu, India. His father was a teacher in the local school, and his mother was a homemaker. He has 4 brothers. His ancestors hail from the village of Karatholuvu near Dharapuram, Tamil Nadu. In 1934, when a close relative living in Chennai, Tamil Nadu died, Sankar's family moved to Chennai to live with the family of the deceased.

Sankar developed passion towards art from his childhood. On his history exams, he would create sketches of famous historical characters. However, his family could not afford the costs of his hobby, and so Sankar would help his drawing teacher fix other students' drawings on the weekends in exchange for free drawing materials.

== Education and career ==
After completing his grade 12 qualifying exam in 1941, he joined the Government College of Fine Arts, Chennai on the advice of his drawing teacher, who saw his potential to succeed in the field of art. There, he would go on to impress his professors with his unique brush techniques and ability to improvise even while using cheaper quality materials.

Though Chandamama would be his ultimate launching pad, his first job was with another then-prominent magazine, Kalaimagal, which he began in 1946, soon after his graduation from the College of Arts.

In November 2021, he was posthumously awarded the title of Padma Shri by the Government of India.

== Personal life ==
Sankar lived in Chennai with his wife, Girija, his daughter and her family. Sankar is survived by his wife, 5 children (4 sons and 1 daughter), and 6 grandchildren. His oldest son and family live in Canada, while his third son and wife live in Australia. He died of natural causes in September 2020 at the age of 96.
