= Dasari Subrahmanyam =

Telugu children's writer and illustrator

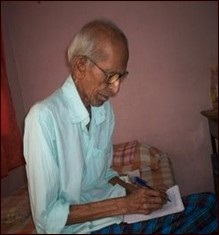
- Born: 17 August 1932
- Died: 27 January 2010
- Occupations: Story writer, Children’s Literature writer, Novelist
- Writing career
- Genre: Fantasy Stories
- Notable works: Agnimala, Chandamama

Dasari Subrahmanyam (1932–2010) was a Telugu writer, known for his serialized fantastic adventure stories published in the children's magazine Chandamama. His stories featured fantasies based in backdrop of ancient and/or medieval India, as apparent from the place names appearing in the stories.

== Literary works ==
Twelve classic Chandamama serials were created by Subrahmanyam, as follows:

- The Comet
- Crocodile Lord
- Three Wizards
- The Bronze Castle
- Fire Island
- The Monster Valley
- The Underworld Fort
- Temple in Ruins
- The Yaksha Mountain
- The Chariot
- The Enchanted Pond
- The Bear Wizard

== Life ==
Subrahmanyam worked with Chandamama for more than 50 years and retired in 2006.

The Prasthanam monthly Telugu magazine published an article on Subrahmanyam in its September 2008 issue.

== See also ==
- Chandamama
