= Mudnakudu Chinnaswamy =

Indian Kannada poet (born 1954)

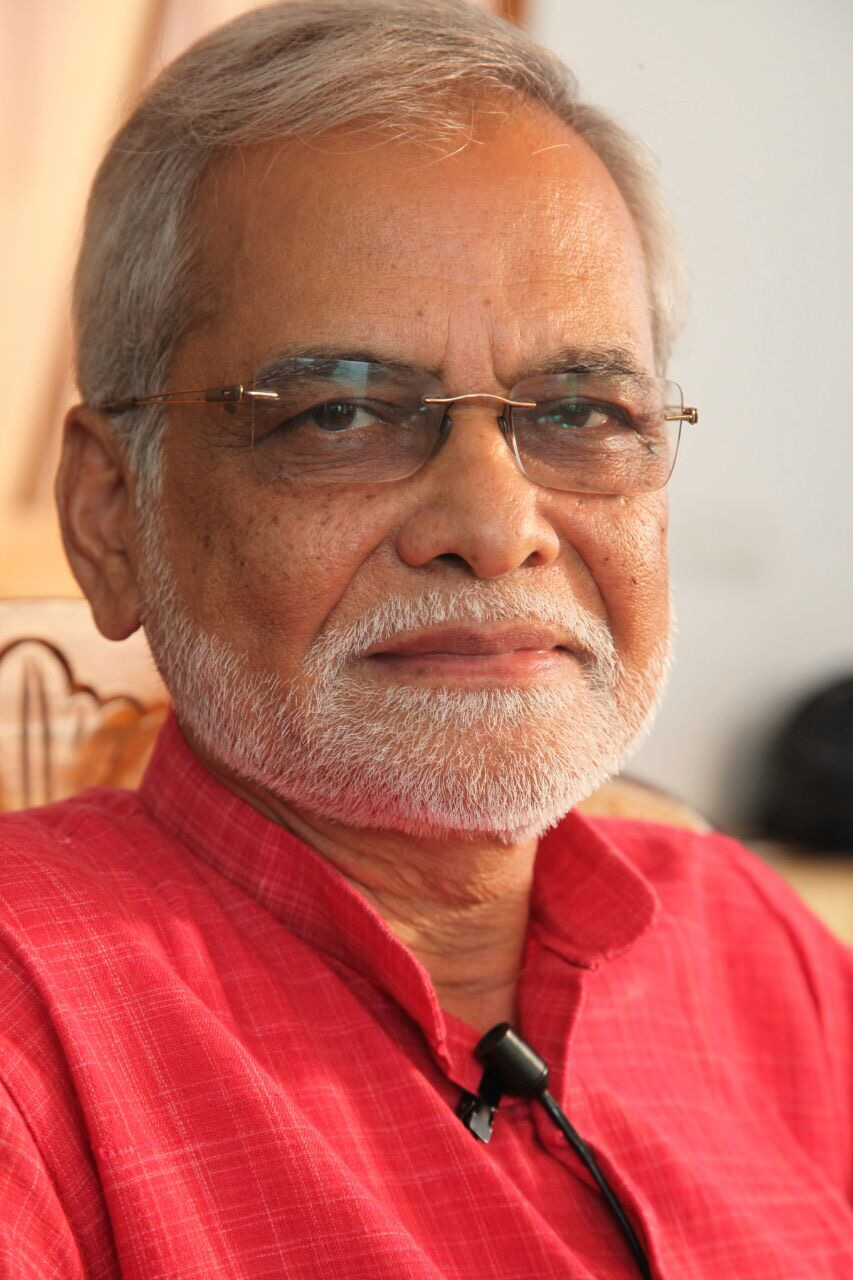
- Born: 22 September 1954; Mudnakudu, Chamarajanagar, Karnataka, India
- Occupations: Writer; poet
- Writing career
- Notable work: Bahutvada Bhaaratha Mattu Bouddha Thaatvikate
- Notable awards: Karnataka Sahitya Academy Award (2009); Rajyotsava Awards (2014); Sahitya Akademi Award (2022)

Mudnakudu Chinnaswamy (22 September 1954) is an Indian Kannada–language poet, playwright and essayist. He authored over 50 works and has received recognitions including Kendra Sahitya Academy award in 2022, for his work "Bahutvada Bhaaratha Mattu Bouddha Thaatvikate".

In 2016, his collection of poems was compiled as Before It Rains Again and translated into English by Rowena Hill, a poet and translator living in Venezuela.

== Awards and honours ==
- Kendra Sahitya Academy award in 2022, for his work "Bahutvada Bhaaratha mattu Bouddha Thaatvikate".
