= Rajyotsava Awards (2014) =

Awards given by the government of Karnataka, India

2014 Rajyotsava Awards
- Date: 1 November 2014
- Location: Bangalore, Karnataka
- Country: India
- Presented by: Government of Karnataka
- Winners: See list

The Government of Karnataka announced the Rajyotsava awards for the year 2014. The awardees included 59 noted eminent individuals from various fields on the occasions of the 59th anniversary of the Karnataka state formation day. The awards were given away at the Ravindra Kalakshetra in Bangalore on 1 November 2014. The 2014 awards saw 1924 nominations that were screened by a panel. Karnataka Chief Minister Siddaramiah announced that the government would bring out commemorative postal stamps of the 59 awardees.

== List of awardees ==
The Rajyotsava award winners for the year 2014 are:

=== Individual ===
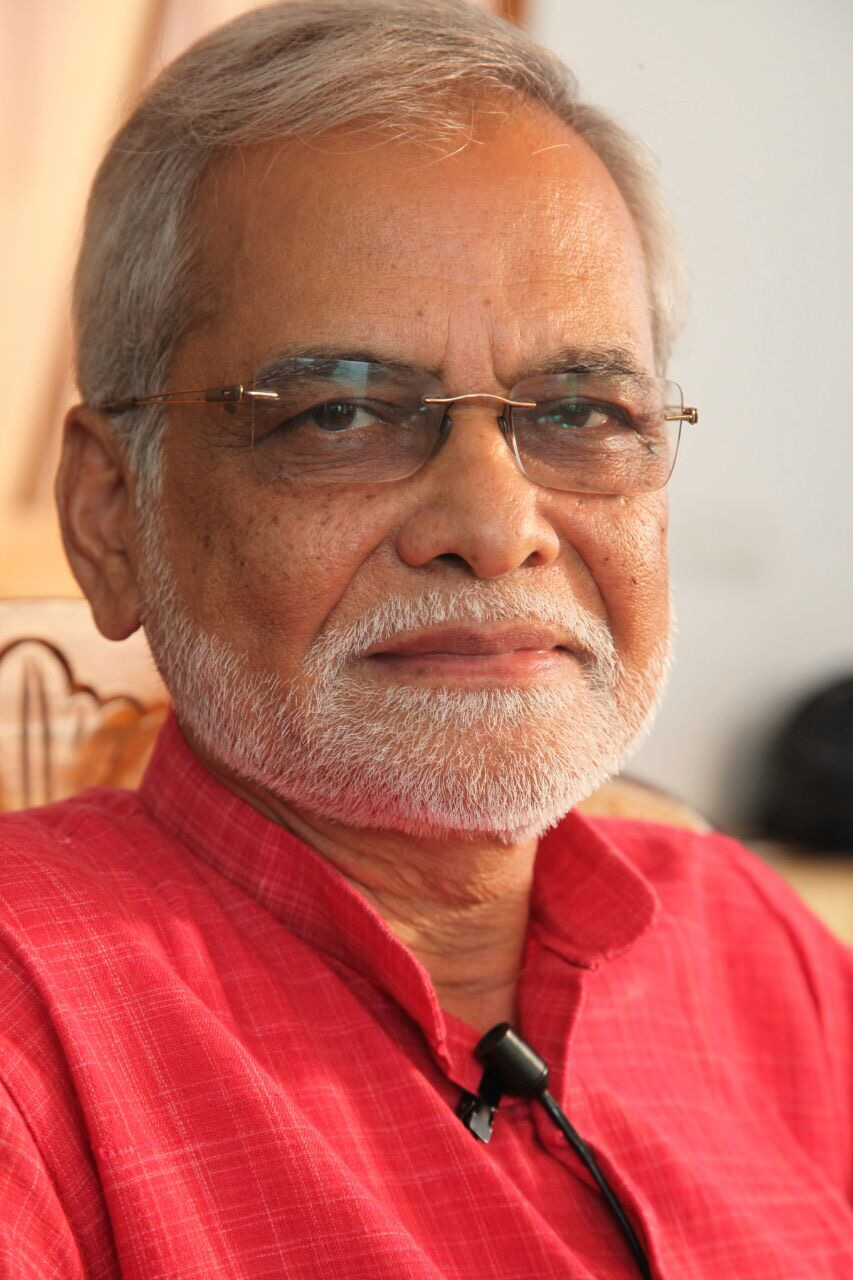
Mudnakudu Chinnaswamy

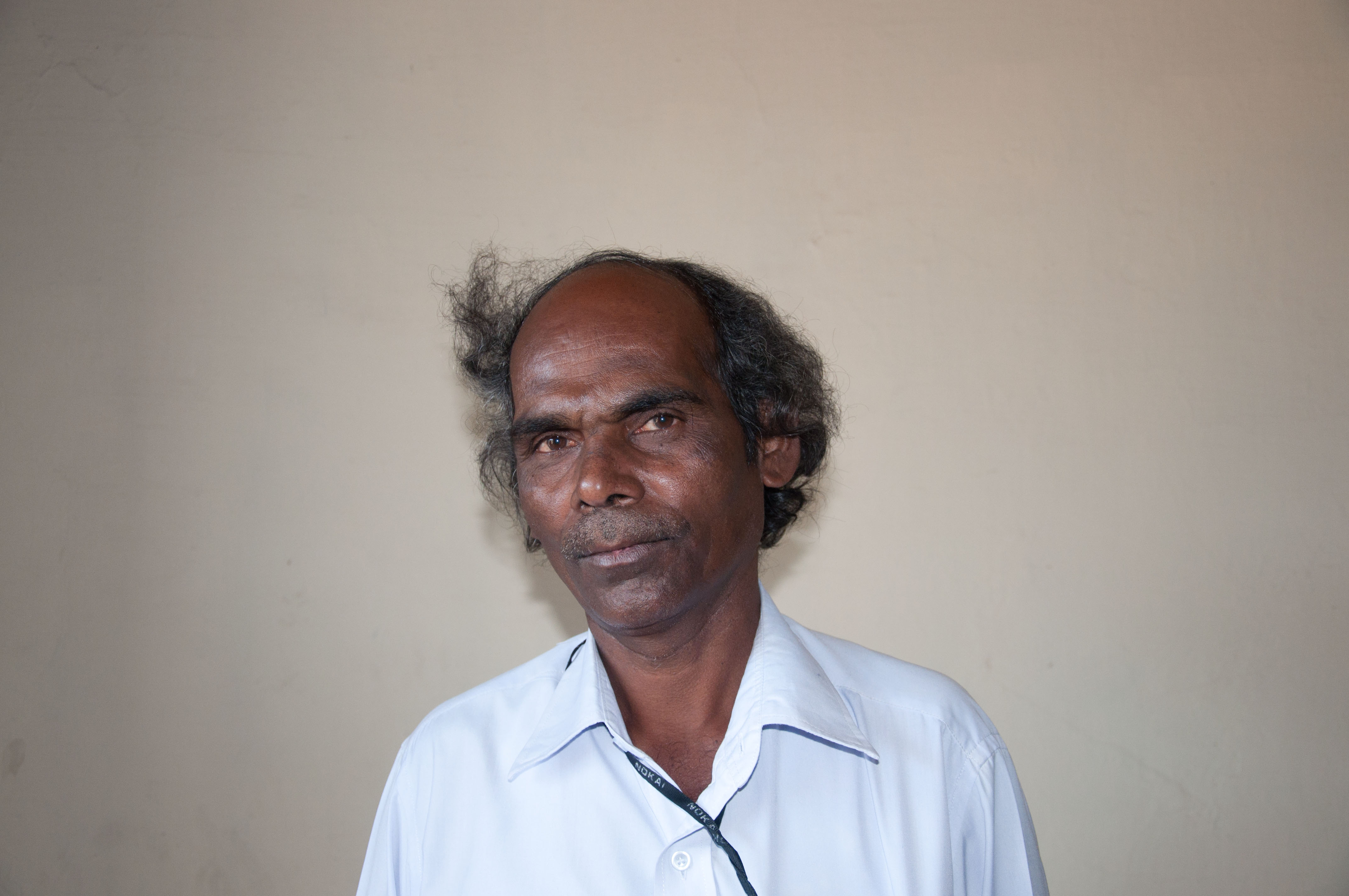
Vaijanath Biradar

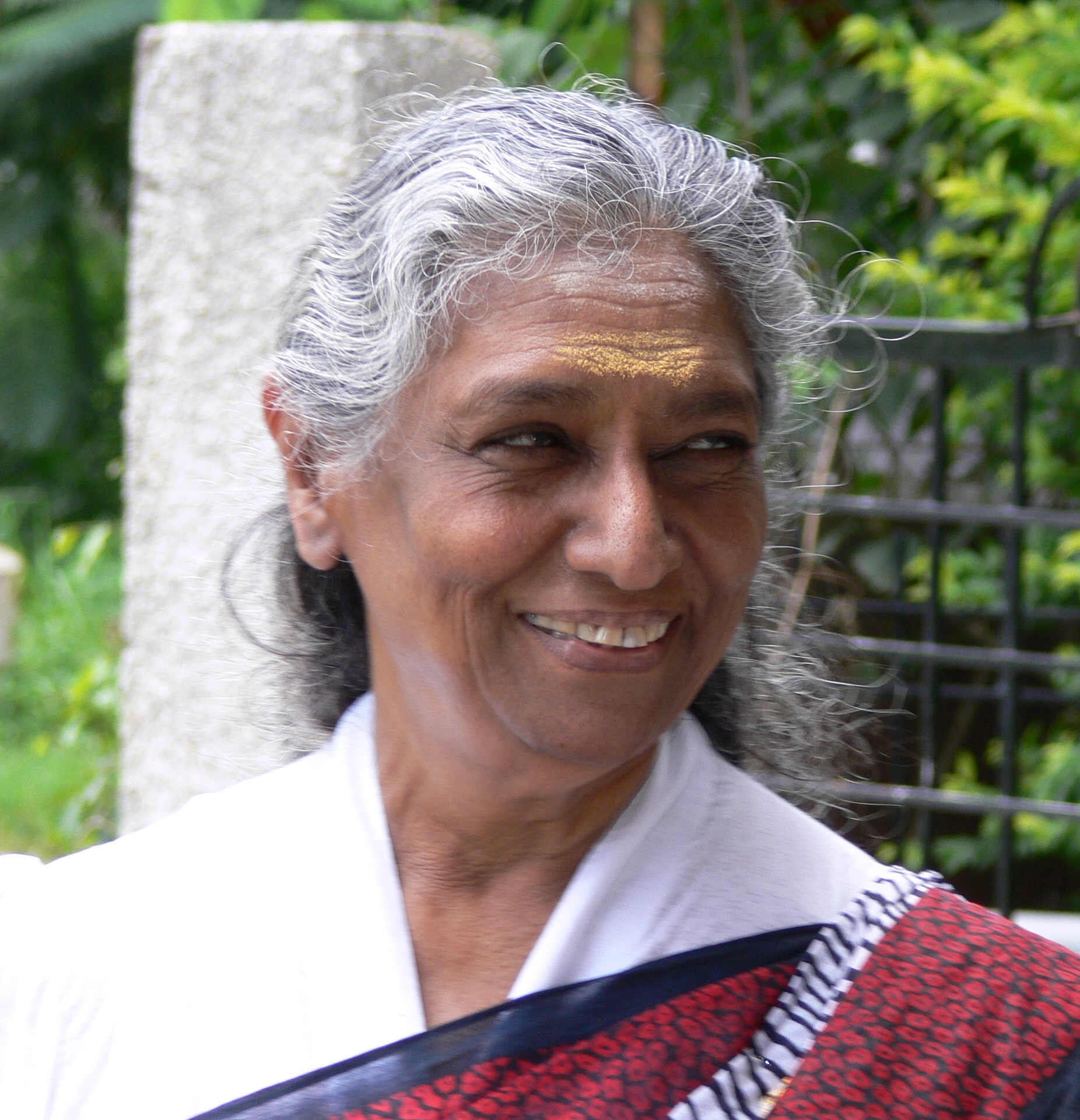
S. Janaki

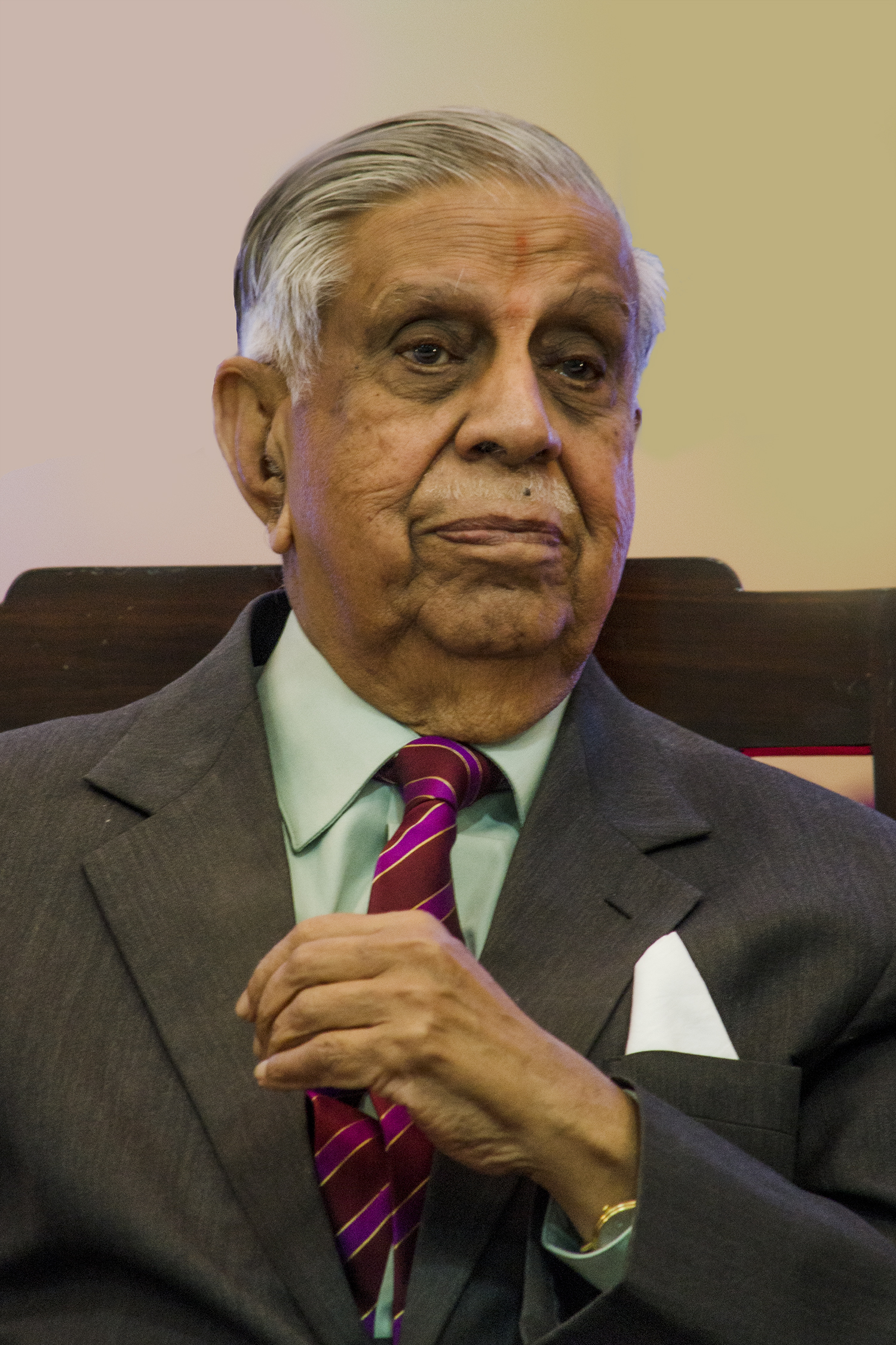
M. N. Venkatachaliah

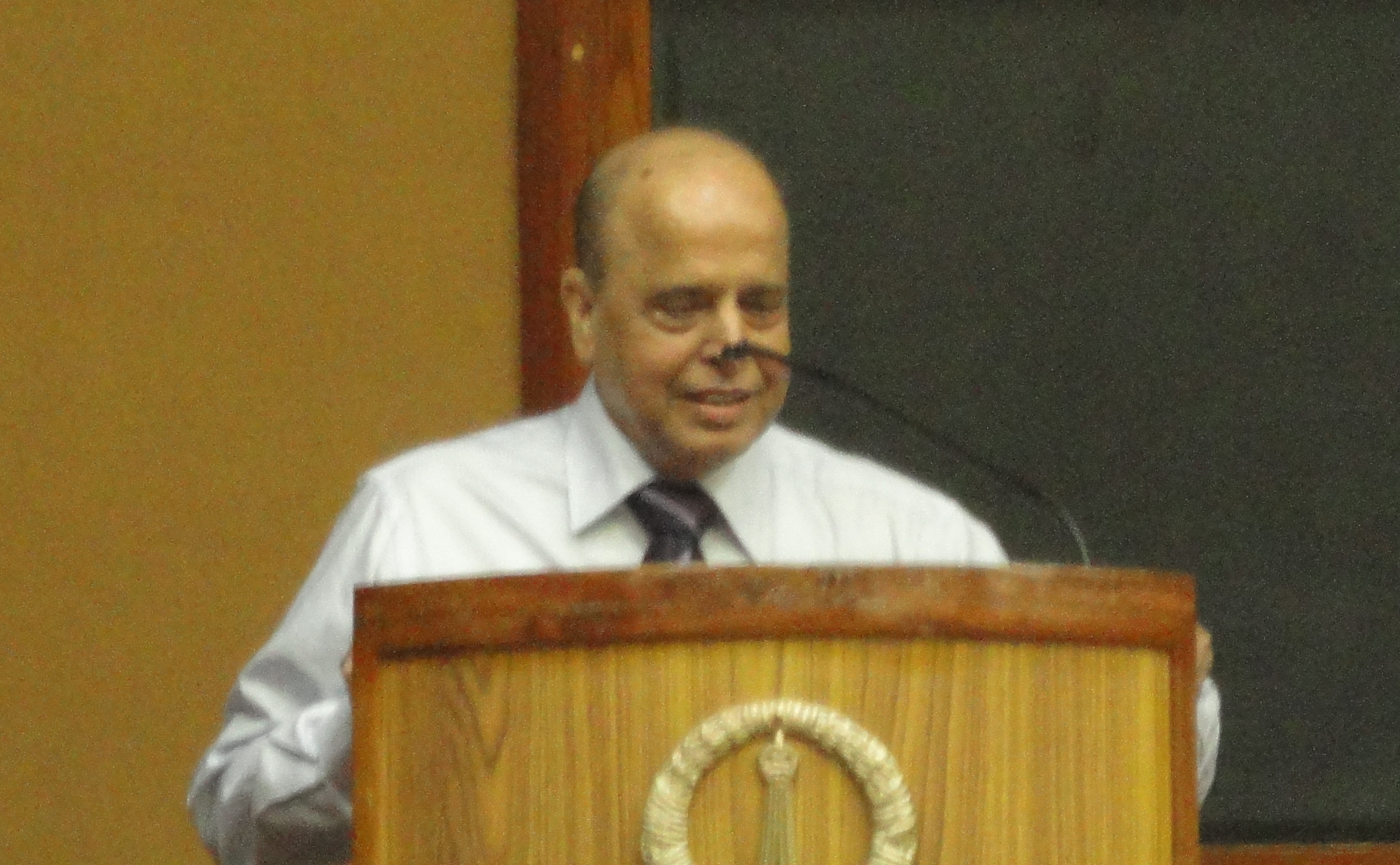
K. Kasturirangan

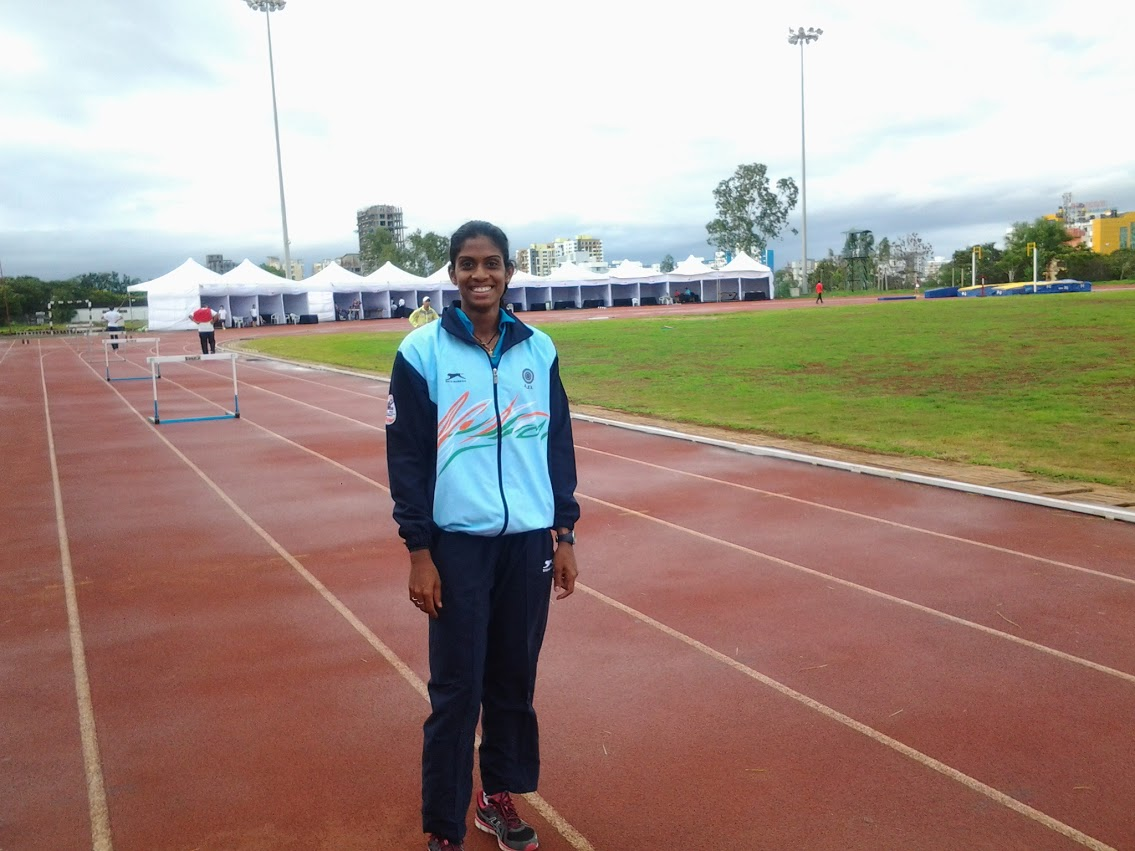
M. R. Poovamma

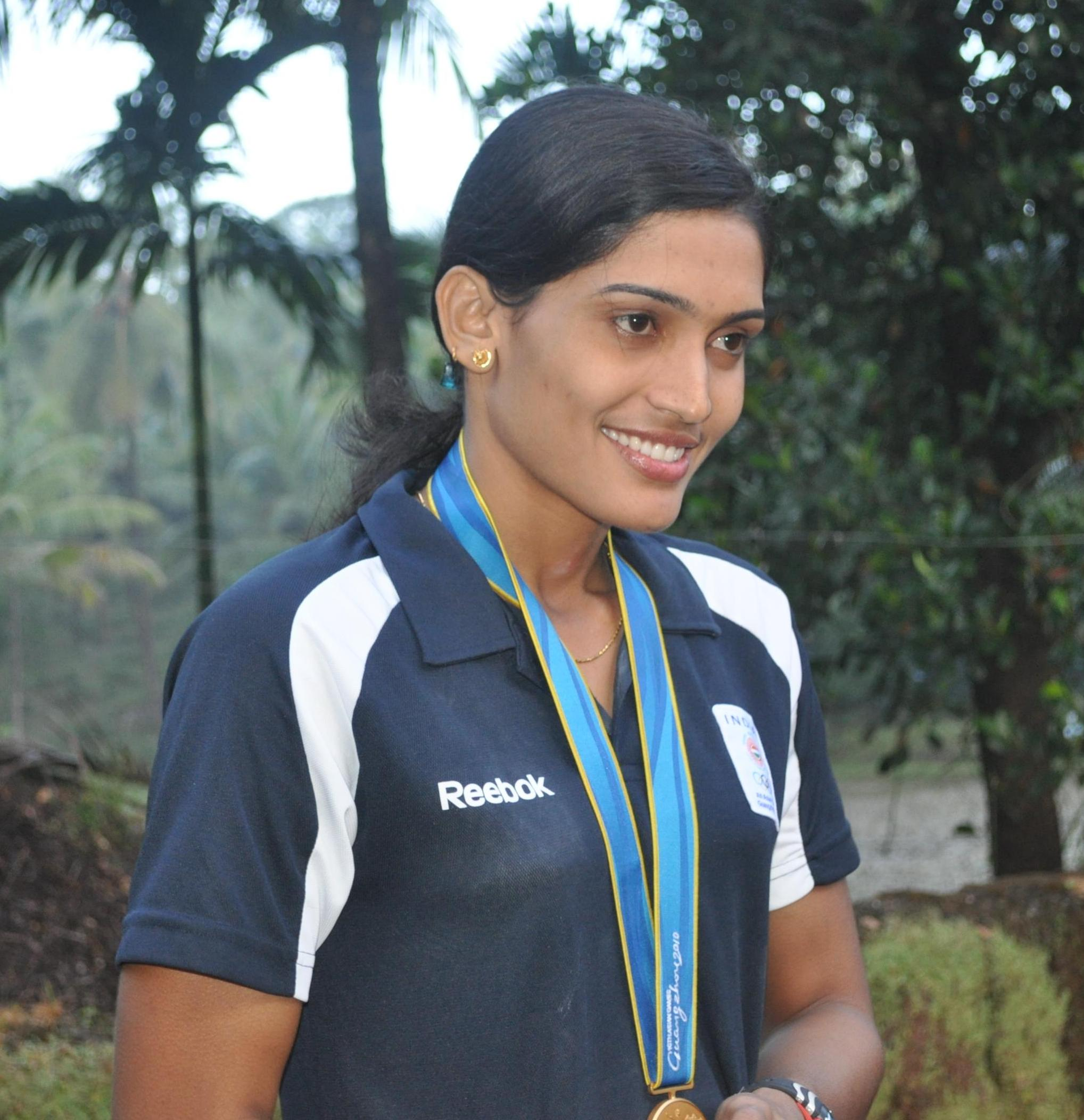
Mamatha Poojari

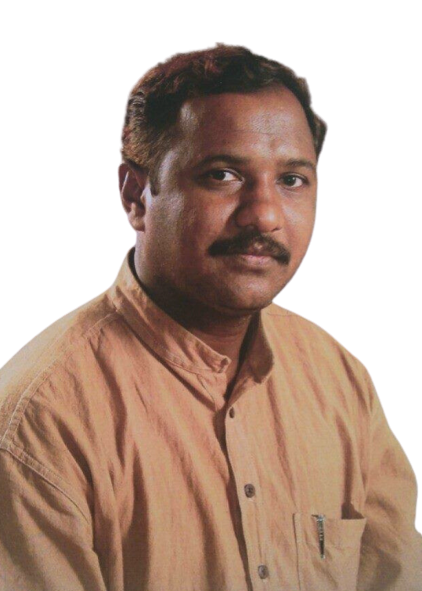
Kasim Kanasavi

Awardee	Area of expertise	Location	Highlights
Mudnakudu B Chinnaswamy	Literature	Chamrajanagar	Renowned Kannada poet & playwright. He has authored 26 books: 6 poetry collections, 4 essays, 3 plays and short stories. He is a prominent dalit voice. He is the first Kannada poet to have an anthology published in Spanish. Winner of 2009 Karnataka Sahitya Academy Award for lifetime achievement.
H Girijamma	Literature	Davangere	A doctor, child psychologist and author 13 novels and six short story collections. Winner of Kannada Sahitya Academy award (2006), Visvesvaraya Award and Attimabbe Prize.
Shudra Srinivas	Literature	Bangalore	Literary figure.
G H Hanneradu Math	Literature	Dharwad	Literary figure.
Vishnu G Bhandari	Literature	Uttara Kannada	Literary figure.
Kanti Hanumantharayaru	Theatre	Bagalkot	Theatre personality.
Abdul Sahab Annegeri	Theatre	Haveri	Theatre personality.
T Nanjundaswamy	Theatre	Mysore	Theatre personality.
J Lokesh	Theatre	Bangalore	Theatre personality.
Shivakumari	Theatre	Bellary	Theatre personality.
V Mani	Dance and Music	Bangalore	Artist.
D Kumara Das	Dance and Music	Bellary	Artist.
S Shankar	Music	Bangalore	Renowned Carnatic music vocalist. Winner of the Best Musician award by the Bangalore Gayana Samaja.
Indu Vishwanath	Music	Bangalore	Noted Kannada movie playback singer.
Pankaja Ramakrishna	Dance	Mysore	Danseuse from Mysore. She is an exponent in classical and folk dance. She established the Sarveshwara Nritya Kalamandira in the year 1984. She has been training students for over 21 years.
S Yogalingam	Folk art	Bangalore	Folk artist and second generation performer of the Keelu kudure for 50 years since the age of 14 in the year 1960. Has over 12,000 performances to his credit. Performed in Kannada films Bangaarada Manushya, Kittur Chennamma and Upendra. Learnt from T.C. Sundara Murthy, former Rajyotsava award winner and pioneer of the dance form.
Maruthi Hanamanth Bhajantri	Folk art	Bagalkot	Folk artist.
Poojari Nagaraj	Folk art	Kolar	Folk artist.
Lakshmibai Reval	Folk art	Yadgir	Folk artist.
Chikkamariyappa	Folk art	Mysore	Folk artist.
Vanase Narayan Ganiga	Yakshagana / Bayalata	Udipi	Yakshagana exponent.
Sampaji Seenappa Rai	Yakshagana / Bayalata	Dakshina Kannada	Yakshagana exponent.
Bheemappa Doddabalappa Shillekyata	Yakshagana / Bayalata	Koppal	Bayalata exponent.
Basappa Dudalappa Salala	Yakshagana / Bayalata	Gadag	Bayalata exponent.
Gururaj Hebbar	Social service	Hassan	Social service.
Dr. P J Jacob	Social service	Dharwad	Social service.
N Venkatesh	Social service	Chikballapur	Social service.
Hanumanth Bommu Gouda	Social service	Uttara Kannada	Social service.
Dr. Leela Sampige	Social service	Tumkur	Activist who has worked for decades for the cause of sex workers.
S. Janaki	Cinema / Singer	Chennai	She is called Nightingale of the South with over 20,000 songs to her credit across numerous languages over 5 decades. She has received 31 state and 4 national awards. She sang her very first Kannada song "TaLenenthu" for the film Rayara Sose in 1957. After her 50 years in the industry, her first song was for the Kannada film "Premigagi Naa".
Vaijanath Biradar Patil	Cinema	Bidar	Veteran Kannada actor of over 300 films. He won the Golden Wheel Award for Best Actor at the Imagineindia Film Festival in Madrid for his role in the movie Kanasemba Kudureyaneri (‘Riding the Stallion of Dreams').
R T Rama	Cinema	Mandya	Kannada film comedian.
M.S. Rajashekar	Cinema	Mysore	Renowned director of Kannada films.
Chandrashekhar Y Shilpi	Sculpture	Gulbarga	Senior sculptor specialising in creating idols in the Chalukya and Rashtrakuta styles. Winner of Karnataka Shilpa Kala Academy Award (2011). Disciple of Nadoja Naganna Badiger (Gulbarga).
Y Yankappa	Sculpture	Davangere	Noted sculptor.
Lakshmi Ramappa	Fine arts / Sculpture	Shimoga	
Kasim Kanasavi	Fine arts / Sculpture	Ilkal, Bagalkot, Karnataka	Visual Artist and Indian Contemporary Painter. He won the award for his painting titled "Gandhi Vichardhara 2" and his painting series called "Ramayana" is Artist's take on the ancient sanskrit epic Ramayana.
D A Choudappa	Agriculture / Environment	Chikballapur	
Shivananda Kalave	Environment	Uttara Kannada	
Keeranageri Jagadish	Agriculture / Environment	Ramanagaram	
Asha Sheshadri	Agriculture	Shimoga	Award winning horticulturist. She has nearly 40 varieties of orchids and 25 anthurium varieties in her green house at Kannangi. Winner of M. H. Marigowda Memorial Best Horticulturist Award in the year 2000.
Khadri S Achyuthan	Media	Mandya	Senior journalist, Author and columnist.
T. Abdul Hafeez	Media	Bangalore	Veteran photo journalist of South India with a career spanning 50 years. Worked with The Hindu between 1979 and 2005 and was Assistant Editor of the publication. As a photo journalist covered the 1991 anti-Tamil violence in Karnataka. Karnataka Olympic Association awardee in 2013.
Lakshmana Kodase	Media	Shimoga	Renowned journalist from Shivamogga district. Journalism career spanning 37 years. Worked with Janapragathi (weekly), Udayaravi (weekly) and Prajavani. In Prajavani, worked as sub-editor, reporter, chief reporter and chief of news bureau. As assistant Editor of the Prajavani, he was instrumental in improving the Saptahika Puravani (Sunday supplement), Bhumika, Cinema Ranjane and Education supplement. He was in charge of the editorial page of Prajavani before his retirement in 2012. Being a creative writer, Lakshmana Kodase published more than 25 books including seven novels, five short stories collection and collections on profiles of several eminent personalities.
Mohan Basavaraja Desai	Media	Belgaum	Veteran freedom fighter as an Editor for 50 years in Kannada journalism. Founding editor of Kannada weekly Darshana subsequently daily Loka Darshana.
Dr. Sandhya Satish Pai	Media	Udupi	Senior journalist and Managing Editor of leading Kannada family weekly Magazine Taranga.
Dr. P. Sathish Chandra	Medicine	Bangalore	Vice-Chancellor of NIMHANS.
Dr. K. Kasturirangan	Science / Technology	Bangalore	Renowned space scientist. Head of ISRO from 1994 to 2003. He is the chairman of Karnataka Knowledge Commission. Former member of the Rajya Sabha.
Dr. B.N. Suresh	Science / Technology	Chikmagalur	Noted aerospace scientist. He was the Director of Vikram Sarabhai Space Centre between 2003 and 2007. He is known for his contribution to Space Capsule Recovery Experiments.
M. R. Poovamma	Sports	Kodagu	Athlete currently ranked number two in Asia in the 400m. Gold medalist in the 4x400m relay at the Asian games in 2014 at Incheon, South Korea. Silver medalist at the Asian Championships in 2013 at Pune.
Mamatha Poojari	Sports	Dakshin Kannada	Kabaddi
Vilas Neelagunda	Sports	Gadag	Sportsman
Justice M N Venkatachalaih	Other fields	Bangalore	25th Chief Justice of India from 1993 to 1994.
Anke Gowda M	Other fields	Mandya	Sugar mill worker turned book collector and Librarian from Haralahalli (Pandavapura taluk) in Mandya. Obsessive book collector with a diverse collection of 200,000 books collected over 30 years in over 8 languages.
Dadapeer Panjarla	Other fields	Raichur	For social harmony. Tattvapada exponent. Authored of 100 tatvapadas.
Kanchyani Sharanappa	Other fields	Bijapur	Children's literature.
Jaya Suvarna	Horanadu Kannadigas	Mumbai	All India Billava Federation and executive president of Bharat Cooperative Bank.

=== Organisations/Associations ===
Awardee	Area of expertise	Location	Highlights
Kannada Sahitya Parishat	Kannada language promotion	Headquartered in Bangalore	NGO whose activities include publishing books, organising literary seminars and promoting research projects in the Kannada language. Organiser of annual conference on Kannada literature called Kannada Sahithya Sammelana since 1915.
Shanti Kuteer Ashram	Known for contribution to spirituality and Advaita (non-dual) siddhanta	Kannur, Bijapur	Shri Ganpatrao Maharaj established the Shanti Kuteer Ashram in Kannur near Bijapur. He has propagated through his discourses principles of advaita and self-realization.
