= Kannambadi =

Coordinates: 12°38′N 76°18′E

- village
- Interactive map of Kannambadi
- Country: India
- State: Karnataka

Languages
  - Official: Kannada
- Time zone: UTC+5:30 (IST)
- Nearest city: Mysore

Kannambadi was a village near Mysore in the Mandya district that was chosen as the site of the Krishna Raja Sagara dam in 1910. The dam is therefore called Kannambadi Katte in Kannada.

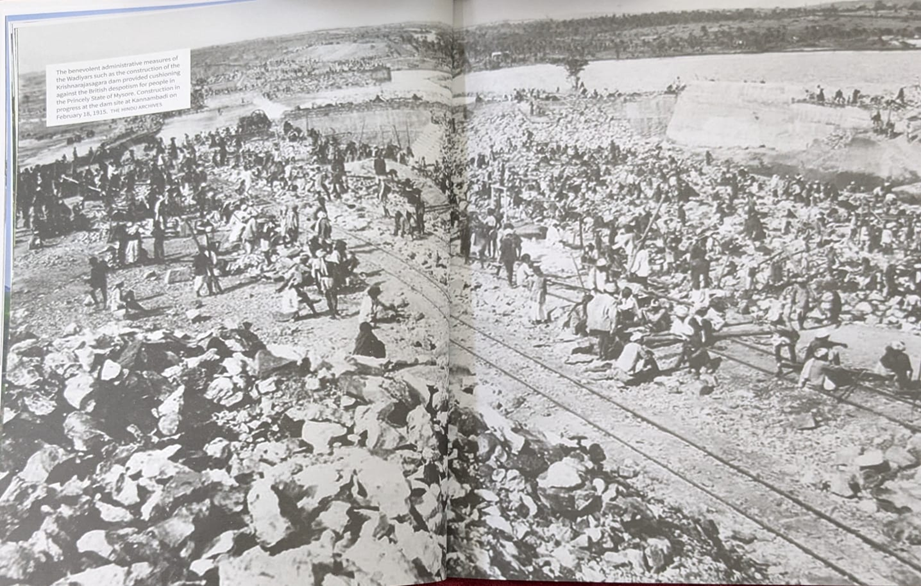
Workers building the KRS dam at Kannambadi in 1915

When the dam was completed, Kannambadi village became submerged under the water. The residents were earlier relocated to a new community called Hosa Kannambadi (New Kannambadi).

The Hoysala-era Venugopala Swamy Temple from the village was relocated to the reservoir's banks in the late 2000s. The temple is now a prominent tourist attraction for those visiting the Brindavan Gardens, especially for the expansive panorama of the Krishna Raja Sagara dam.

Kannambadi is not to be confused with the Aane Kannambadi village in the Hassan district of Karnataka.
