= ShakthiDass =

Shakthi Dass
- Born: January 9, 1948 (age 78); Andhra Pradesh, India
- Occupations: Artist, Editor, Publisher
- Website: www.chandrabala.com

Shakthi Dass, also spelt as ShakthiDass or Shakthi Das, is an Indian painter, sketcher, and wrapper artist for children's magazines, comics and newspapers for the last four decades.

He has been sketching nonstop professionally for the past 4 decades. He has freelanced for many Indian magazines like Bommarillu, MVS Novels, Balabharathi, Rishi Peettam, Bujjai, Chinnari, Balamitra, Chandamama, Rotary News, Vijaya Publications and Oriya Vijay. He has also done thousands of paintings for international publications and office and industrial settings.

He started Chandrabala Publications. He is the founder of Aayurveda Sanjeevini and Chandrabala magazine in both English and Telugu versions. Shakthi Dass can draw 100 illustrations in six hours and is under consideration by the Guinness World Records.

His vivid paintings range from oil paintings, canvas, watercolor, acrylic, glass, and pencil covering abstract, figurative, cartoons, and realism arts. His unique skill is in sketching with pencil and then with brush or directly with brush without using a pencil sketch layout. He is known for conventional, unconventional and acrylic works in expressionist and cubist styles.

== Early life and education ==
Shakthi Dass Goud was born on January 9, 1948 at Aratlakatta village near Palakol in West Godavari district of Andhra Pradesh. He was born in Goud's family to Sri. Pastula Anjaneyula Goud and Smt. Pastula Annapurna. His grandfather Sri. Pastula Sagaram was a Gandhian and then M.L.C. He has two daughters.

He did his Bachelors in Arts from Andhra University from Eluru in Andhra Pradesh.

== Career ==
Shakthi Dass showed interest in painting from his childhood when he was 14 years old. He earned is first income of 74 Indian rupees when he painted a picture of Mary for a church in his village. During an interview with Telugu newspaper, Shakthi Dass discovered that this picture is currently in a church in Italy.

He moved to Chennai, formerly Madras for employment in painting career and joined Ketha Cini Publicity studios in 1968 as a cini publicity designer in preparing sketches for film sets through his links from established hero Chalam cum relative, a film producers cum artists like Karri Apparao Babji and Karri Rangarao. Later he joined M.V.S Publishers to sketch wrappers for their novels.

During 80's and 90's before the arrival of Disney World graphics and comics, there is no Telugu kid who were not enthralled with child magazine Chandamama for which ShakthiDass did cover paintings with medieval Indian depictions covering kings, queens, and witchcrafts right from ancient, mythological and folklore. Shakthidass did cover paintings for Chandamama in various languages including Tamil, Telugu, Kannada, Malayalam and Oriya.

He further fine tuned his skills while working with then famous Chandamama child magazine under the painter Late Vaddadi Pappayya who was instrumental in Chandamama's grand success in Telugu. There were several years where he enthralled the Tamil mythological movie and magazine industry to the extent of producers and publishers publicised and encashed their projects with ShakthiDass title in advertisements and cutouts.

He later did innumerable wrappers, storyboard illustration, and sketches for various magazines and novels in Telugu, Kannada, Tamil, English and Oriya including Bommarillu, Chandamama, Balamitra, Nandanam, Bujjayi, Balabharati, Kumkuma, Dinakaran, Vasuki, Rishi Petam, Rotary News, Vijaya Publications, Oriya News, Chinnari, Kannada Chokkalingam.

During an interview in a Telugu channel, he attributed his success to an opportunity to draw wrappers in the well known, then children magazine Bommarillu which brought name and fame to the extent of some magazines, films and publishers in Tamil deferring their release date till ShakthiDass wounds up his work. He also did and does innumerable paintings for international publications and industrial settings. He also does short writing, expresses the stories through his paintings, also runs a training institute in Hyderabad to impart the revolutionary techniques he mastered in his long career of more than four decades with an ultimate aim of using his Chandrabala as a platform to generate as many artists as possible.

=== Chandrabala ===
Shakthidass started his own children's magazine called Chandrabala in August 2009. It comes in Telugu and English languages. Chandrabala is the child magazine to widen the minds of children through stories coupled with graphics covering mythology, comics, history, culture, current events, ghost cum horror, inventions, discoveries, science and fiction to enable the kids experience thrill, excitement, wonder, fear, laughter, sadness, evil, compassion, sorrow and sympathy.

=== Aayurveda Sanjeevini ===
Aayurveda Sajeevini is a monthly magazine about Ayurveda, an Indian made medicine with articles about different ayurveda medicine related to health, hygiene, yoga and home made tips and remedies for common problems.

== Behind ShakthiDass name ==
His name "ShakthiDass" where "Shakthi" stands for "Power" in Hindu mythology and Dass stands for "Dedicativeness" and started naming his paintings with name "ShakthiDass" which ultimately became his recognised and brand name.
