= Chandamama =

Indian children's magazine

- The first Telugu issue of Chandamama (చందమామ) on 15 August 1947 on the occasion of Independence Day.
- Categories: Children's magazine
- Frequency: Monthly
- Founded: July 1947; 79 years ago
- Final issue: March 2013
- Company: Geodesic Limited (formerly Geodesic Information Systems Limited)
- Country: India
- Language: Telugu (as Chandamama/చందమామ); Tamil (as Ambulimama/அம்புலிமாமா); Kannada (as Chandamama/ಚಂದಮಾಮ); Sanskrit; Assamese (as Chandmama/চান্দমামা); Hindi (as Chandamama/चन्दामामा); Odia (as Jahnamaamu/ଜହ୍ନମାମୁଁ); English; Marathi (as Chandoba/चाँदवा); Malayalam (as Ambili Ammavan/അമ്പിളി അമ്മാവൻ); Bengali (as Chadmama/চাঁদমামা)

Chandamama was a classic Indian monthly magazine for children, known for its illustrations and long-running mythological and magical stories. The magazine was founded in 1947 by Chakrapani and Nagi Reddi, who later gained prominence as Telugu film producers, the magazine was originally launched in the Telugu language.

It was edited for 28 years by Kodavatiganti Kutumba Rao, a close friend of Chakrapani and a prominent figure in Telugu literature, until his death in August 1980. In 2007, Chandamama was acquired by Geodesic, a Mumbai-based software services company, with plans to transition the 60-year-old magazine into the digital era. However, the magazine is now defunct because Geodesic defaulted on outstanding loans and was ordered to be wound up by the Mumbai High Court.

As of July 2016, the current status of the magazine is uncertain, as the parent company Geodesic is undergoing liquidation. The Chandamama brand and IP are expected to be sold off in due course. The magazine's official website has expired and been dropped by the owners and the current website is not associated with Chandamama.

== The Magazine ==
The main features of Indian Mythology were completely written by Kutumbarao, who also developed the magazine by encouraging young writers in Telugu and adapted them to suit the Telugu written style that he made so popular in Andhra and the Telugu speaking people for decades. Some of the stories and the folklore features were written by Dasari Subrahmanyam, who made serials like Patala Durgam, etc. also very popular.

It was revamped in November 2008 and had gone contemporary in terms of language, presentation, artwork, and content. While it continued to carry old favourites like Vetala Panchavimshati and mythological tales, there were several new additions including contemporary stories, adventure serials, sports, technology, news pages, etc. Considering the new trends in children's literature and the emerging importance given to academic study and analysis of the same, Chandamama had striven to keep its editorial policies in line with the times. As the oldest brand in the field, Chandamama had taken up the responsibility of delivering entertaining, sensitive, and educational literature for its young readers.

Chandamama was published in 13 languages (including English), and had a readership of about 200,000.

== Style of storytelling ==
The magazine started the trend of storytelling which is bound by common thread of moral values, with a grandparents' style of storytelling in a flexible third-person narrative mode, on print.

The stories published have been drawn from numerous historical and modern texts in India, as well as from other countries. Mythology, epics, fables, parables and even useful hearsay were spun suitably to feed the impressionable minds so that they seek the right direction in life, even while entertaining them thoroughly. The stories embedded in the never-ending story of King Vikramāditya and Vetala (Vampire), an adaptation of an ancient Sanskrit work Baital Pachisi, brought wide repute to this magazine, and were also featured in popular TV serials. In each issue, the Vetala, in order to prevent him fulfilling a vow, poses a typical catch-22 question to king Vikramāditya, involving a moral dilemma. The wise king answers correctly, and is thus defeated by the Vetala, forcing the king to do it all over again and again.

== History ==
=== 1940s-2000s ===
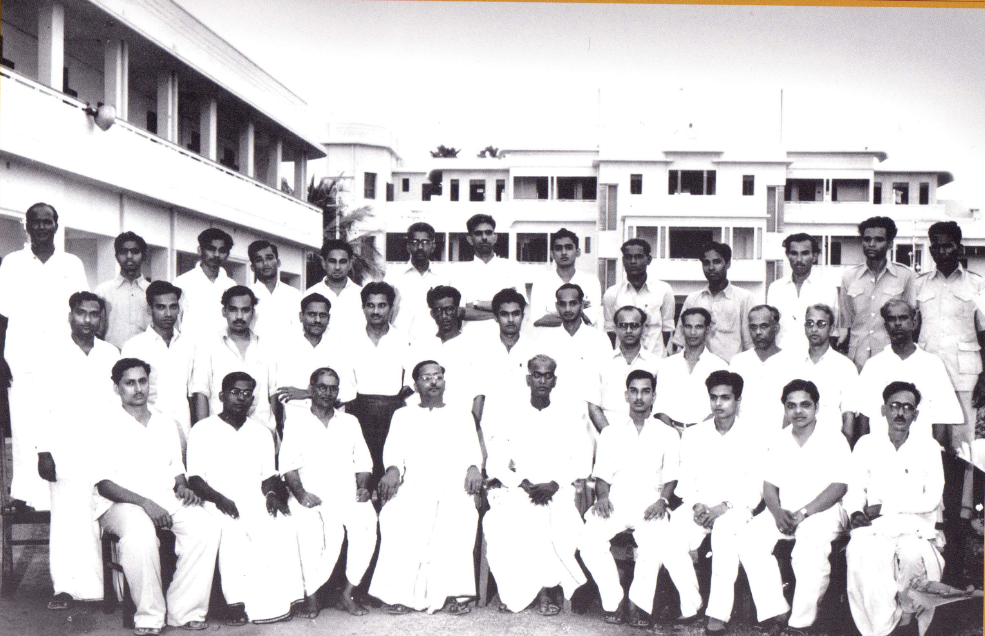
Chandamama Magazine team in 1952

The first edition of Chandamama was released in July 1947. The founder editor of the magazine was Chakrapani. It was printed and published by Nagi Reddi who later became a leading film producer in South India. Chakrapani, a friend of Nagi Reddy, was the force behind magazine, and his vision, perception and understanding of the target readership brought name and fame to the magazine.

Chandamama was first published in Telugu and Tamil (as Ambulimama) in July 1947. Kannada edition first appeared in July 1949 followed by Hindi in August 1949. Marathi (as Chandoba) and Malayalam (as Ambili Ammavan) editions appeared in April 1952 followed by Gujarati in 1954, English in 1955, Odia (as Jahnamamu) and Sindhi in 1956, Bengali (as Chadmama) in July 1972, Punjabi in 1975, Assamese in 1976, Sinhala in 1978, Sanskrit in April 1984 and Santali in 2004. The Punjabi, Sindhi and Sinhala editions were published only for a short period. No English editions were published from October 1957 to June 1970. The magazine ceased publication in 1998, owing to labour disputes. However, the magazine relaunched a year later. It was available in 12 Indian languages and English.

For many decades, Chandamama's illustrators defined the look of the magazine. They included such names as M. T. V. Acharya, T. Veera Raghavan, who signed his work as Chithra; Vaddadi Papaiah, who signed as Vapa; Kesava Rao who signed as Kesava; M. Gokhale; and K. C. Sivasankaran, alias Sankar, who joined Chandamama in the year 1951. Later artists such as Shakthi Dass; M. K. Basha, who signed as Razi; Gandhi Ayya, aka Gandhi; and P. Mahesh (Mahe), also continued the tradition into current times. Initially, the covers were printed in four-colours, while the illustrations inside used line drawings. Each page of Chandamama had an illustration, although in the strict sense of the term, Chandamama is not a comic book, with the exception of the Chitra-katha column.

The magazine has been in family hands since foundation, and the current publisher, B Viswanatha Reddy, continued the tradition after taking over the affairs of the magazine from his father. In 1999, the company was floated as a public limited organization, with Morgan Stanley taking a sizable stake in the company.

The last editor was Prashant Mulekar of Geodesic.

=== 2000s-present ===
In August 2006, it was reported that Disney was set to buy a stake in Chandamama. In 2007, Chandamama was acquired by technology company Geodesic Information Systems.

As of July 2016, the current status of the magazine is unknown, as the parent company Geodesic is under the liquidation process and the Chandamama brand and IP is expected to be sold off in due course. The official website of the magazine was allowed to expire and drop by the magazine owners and the current website is not associated with the Chandamama magazine.

With the acquisition by a technology company, Chandamama has announced that it will digitize and make available much of its content via digital libraries and on the web. In addition, Chandamama Multimedia CDs have also been published.

In late 2007, Chandamama released its revamped internet presence to better cater to readers who demand information and content beyond the printed publication. It has also tied up with satellite radio service provider Worldspace to bring the Indian storytelling tradition live through radio.

In July 2008, the publication launched its online portal in Telugu, English, Hindi and Tamil. It declared that all 60 years publication in all Indian languages would be put online soon.

Chandamama has stopped publishing in all languages from March 2013, without issuing any press release and without giving any notifications or refund to subscribers. A message was given on the official Facebook page of the magazine on 30 May 2013 saying that they could not publish issues from March 2013 because of technical problems, and the magazine would restart publishing from July 2013 onwards. However, the official website of the magazine also went down in July 2013, saying "We are currently doing some enhancement and upgrades to the website. We will be back soon."

In July 2016, the original website of the magazine was allowed to expire by the parent company and it was dropped. Currently, the website is no longer associated with the Chandamama magazine or the parent company.

In Aug 2017, website Chandamama.in Link was started to preserve the Chandamama culture for future generations. This website has more than 10 languages and growing with the community support. The website provides access to old magazines free of cost.
