= M. T. V. Acharya =

Indian painter and illustrator

M. T. V. Acharya (1920 – c.1992) was an Indian painter, illustrator, and art educator, best known for his work in the popular children's magazine Chandamama.

== Early life and education ==
Born in Mysuru, Acharya showed an interest in art from a young age. He received training under artists Y. Subramanyam Raju and Tankasale, and later studied at the Chamarajendra Technical Institute in Mysuru.

== Career ==
During World War II, Acharya worked as a tracer for the Hindustan Aeronautics Limited (HAL) factory in Bangalore. He transitioned to a career as a freelance artist, holding his first exhibition in Chennai (then Madras) in 1945.

In 1947, he joined the editorial team of the children's magazine Chandamama. His mythological illustrations, particularly for the cover art and stories from the Mahabharata, became iconic features of the publication. He eventually served as the editor of the magazine's Kannada edition.

Between 1963 and 1965, he served as the art director for the Kannada daily newspaper Tai Nadu. Later in his career, he focused on art education, founding the Acharya Chitrakala Bhavan in Bangalore, an institution that offered correspondence courses in painting.

== Style and legacy ==
Acharya is recognized alongside Raja Ravi Varma and S. M. Pandit as a significant figure in Indian mythological painting. His work was characterized by traditional Mysore-style influences, which became highly recognizable to readers of Indian illustrated media in the 1950s. His contributions to the field are documented in works such as the M.T.V. Acharya Karnataka Artist Series published by the Karnataka Lalithakala Academy.

== Bibliography ==
- M.T.V. Acharya, Karnataka Artist Series 22, Karnataka Lalithakala Academy.
