= Venugopala Swamy Temple =

Hindu temple near Krishna Raja Sagara, Karnataka, India

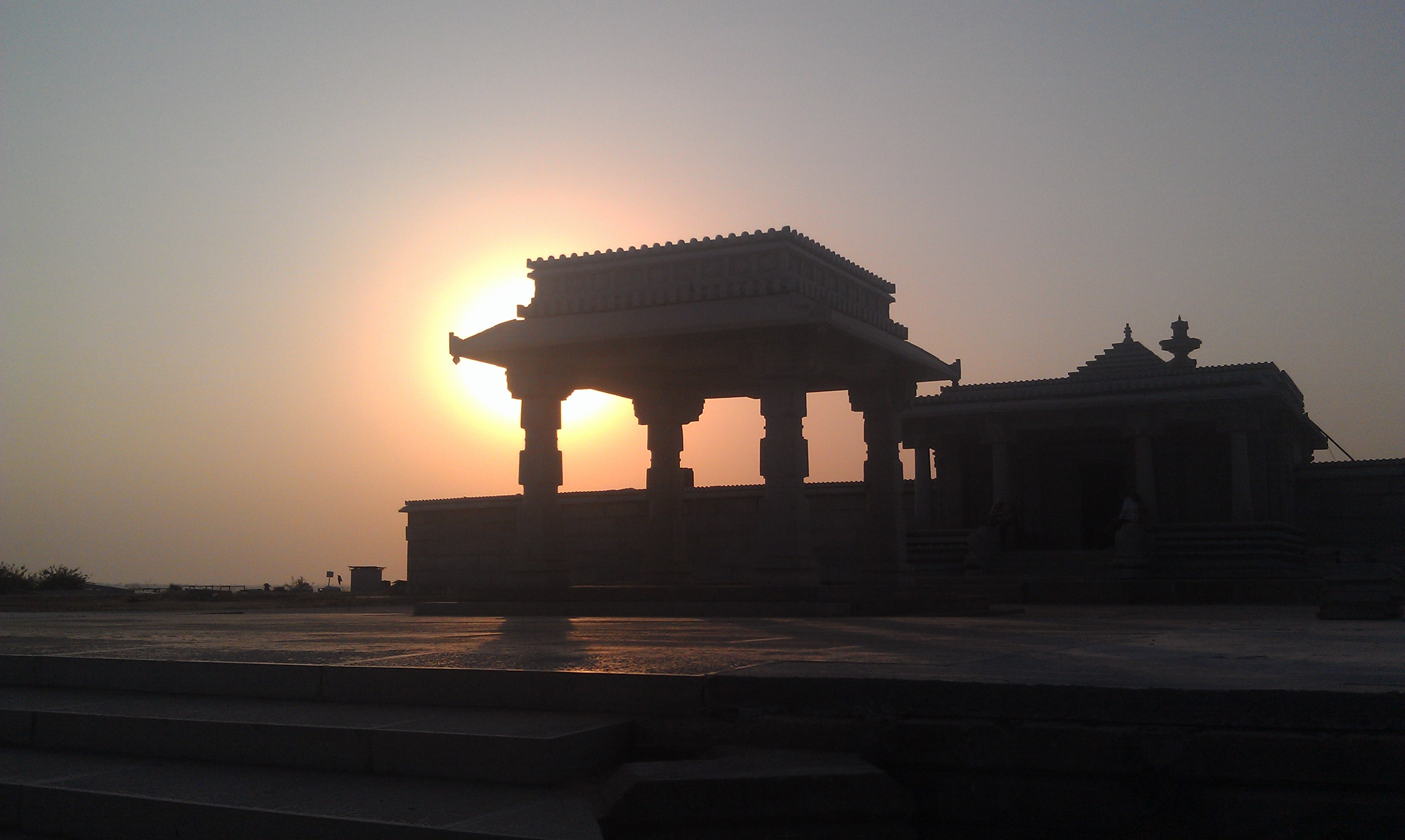
- Entrance to the temple complex

- Location within Karnataka

Religion
- Affiliation: Hinduism
- District: Mandya
- Deity: Lord Krishna
- Governing body
- Status: Open

Location
- Location: Hosa Kannambadi, Near Krishna Raja Sagara
- State: Karnataka
- Country: India
- Coordinates: 12°26′40″N 76°34′04″E

Architecture
- Type: Hoysala architecture
- Completed: 12th Century AD (originally) Restoration and relocation began 2002

The Venugopala Swamy Temple located at Hosa Kannambadi, near Krishna Raja Sagara, is an example of Hoysala architecture in Karnataka, India. This temple was built in the 12th century AD around the same time as the Chennakesava Temple at Somanathapura, Mysore district.

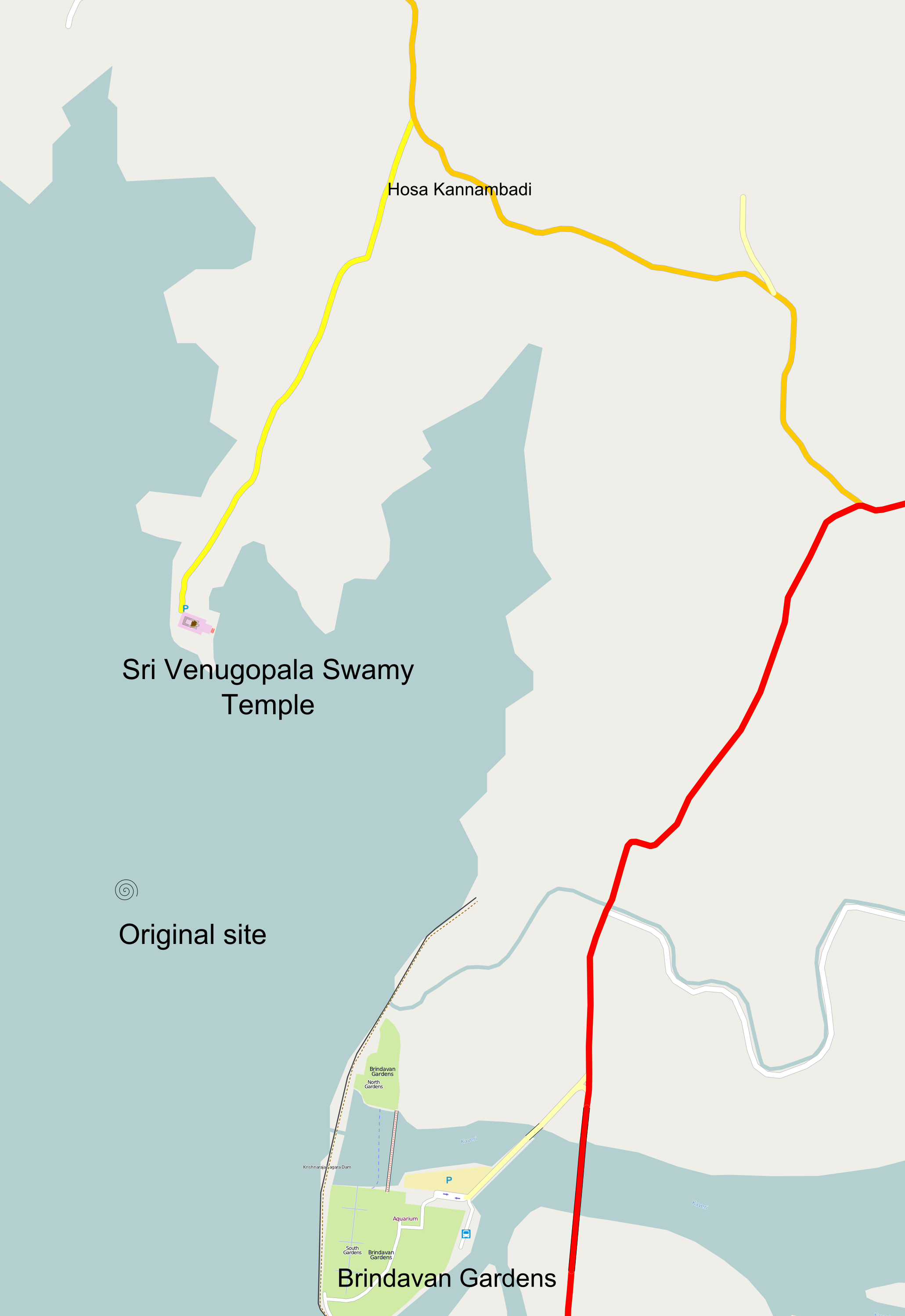
Map showing the temple and the original site

== Original location ==
Before the Krishna Raja Sagara dam project was conceived by M. Visvesvarayya in 1909, the temple complex was located in the village of Kannambadi. The KRS Dam project meant that Kannambadi and other surrounding settlements would be submerged. The then king of Mysore, Krishna Raja Wadiyar IV ordered the construction of a new village for the residents of Kannambadi and named it Hosa Kannambadi (New Kannambadi).

However, the Venugopala Swamy temple complex and 2 other temples namely Kenneshwara (Ishwara) temple and Kalamma Temple had to be abandoned. By 1930, the first phase of the dam was completed and all three temples were submerged.

The main idol of Venugopalaswamy, Krishna playing on flute as a cow-herd, was shifted to a new temple in the rehabilitated village before the submersion.

== Architecture ==
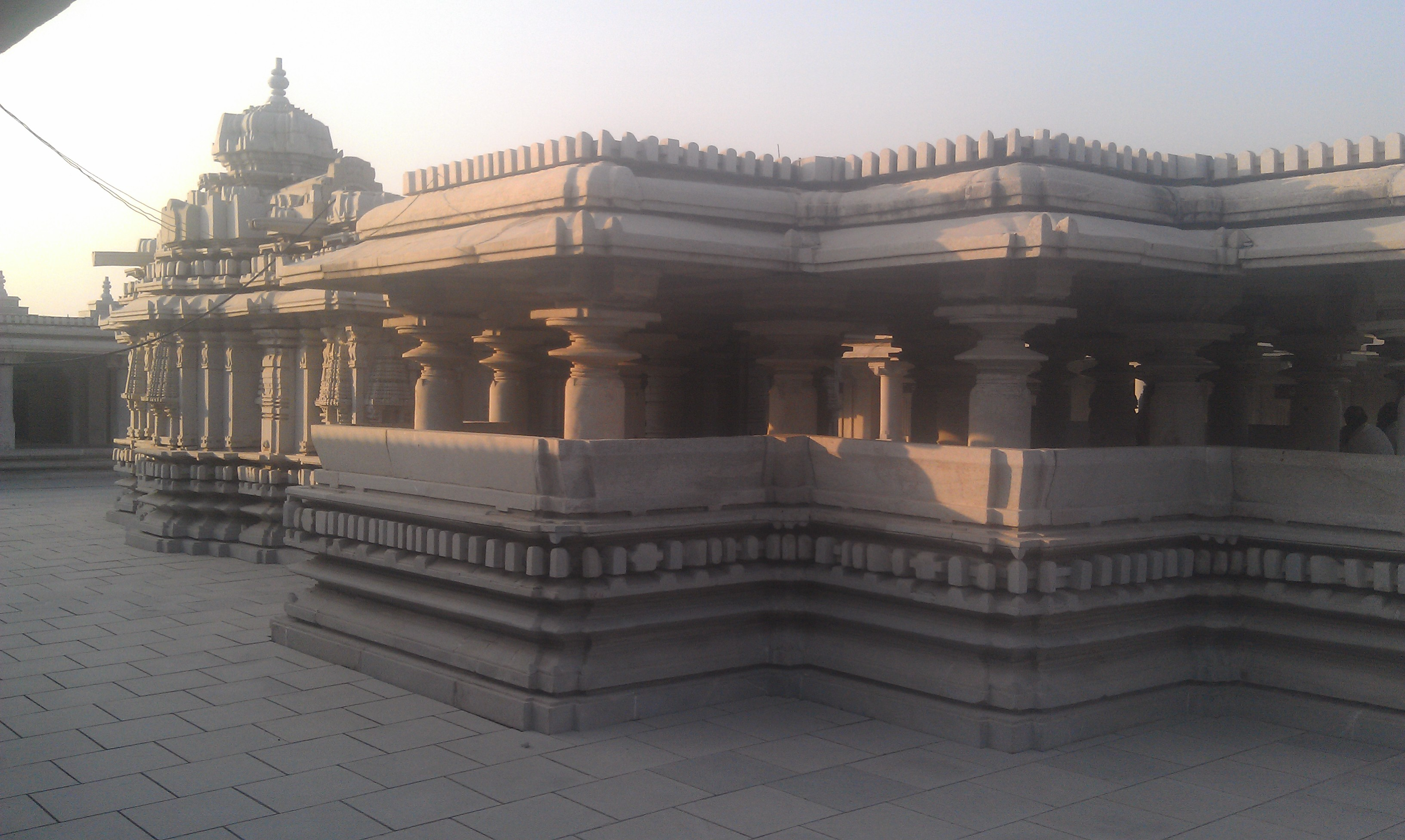
The temple complex at its relocated site

The original temple complex was massive, with an area of around 50 acres (20 ha) 100 by 60 yards (91 m × 55 m).

The complex was a symmetrical building enclosed by two 'prakaras' and the outer gate (Mahadwara) had verandahs on both sides, flanked by the yagasala and the kitchen. This was enclosed by the second mahadwara, which led to the inner enclosure and was akin to the Somanathapura temple.

The temple had a garbhagriha (sanctum sanctorum), a vestibule, a middle hall and a mukhya mantapa (main hall). The cell opposite to the entrance had a figure of Kesava (Krishna) and the south cell, containing the figure of Gopalakrishna, was a later addition.

== Submersion and restoration ==
When the KRS dam was conceived in 1909, the temple was condemned for submersion. By 1930, the entire erstwhile village of Kannambadi was completely buried underwater. However, the temple would resurface whenever the water levels in the reservoir dropped, typically during drought years. This was most evident around the year 2000.

For more than 70 years the temple lay underwater, when the Khoday Foundation under the guidance of liquor baron and philanthropist Mr. Sri Hari Khoday took up the task of relocating and restoring the temple. It was initially planned to shift the entire complex to Madhuvana Park in Mysore. However, protests from the villagers of Hosa Kannambadi convinced the foundation to shift it to a place near the rehabilitated village. The cost of the project was estimated to be around ₹2.5 crore.

The new site is about one km to the north of the original site; the backwaters would touch the outer walls of the temple if the water level of the KRS touched 124.80 ft, its maximum capacity. It is 9 km by road from Brindavan Gardens.

The in-house architects of the group had shot the original temple on video, taken over 16,000 photographs, and marked each and every slab used in the construction of the original temple. Each and every temple stone was removed and reconstructed at Hosa Kannambadi with trained artisans and sculptors, with half a dozen experts from Tamil Nadu also involved in the reconstruction.

The temple restoration was completed in December 2011. It however has become a tourist hotspot considering its tale of submersion and relocation.

== Gallery ==
Venugopalaswamy Temple Gallery

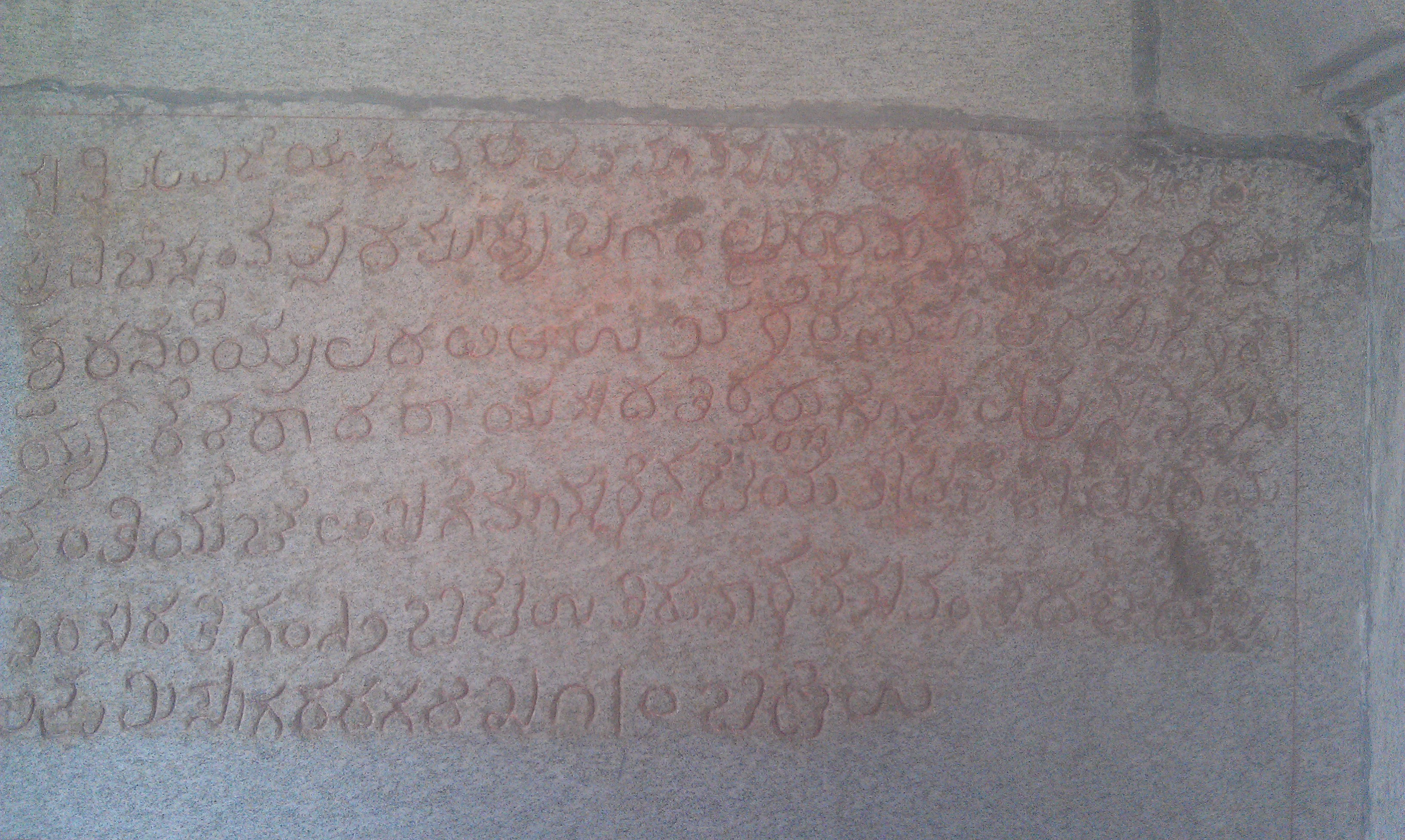
An inscription written in halegannada seen at the entrance

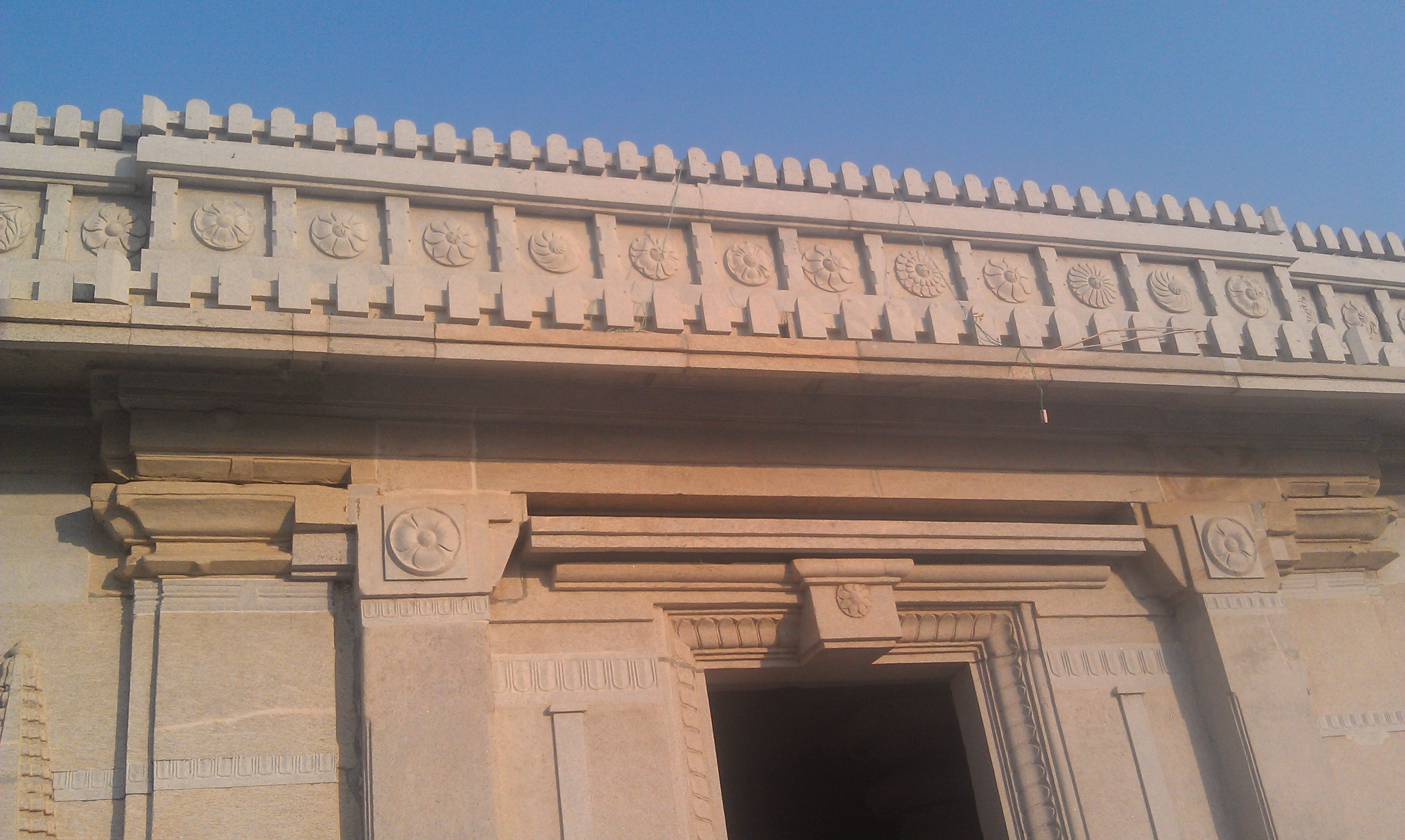
Outer wall of the Venugopalaswamy temple

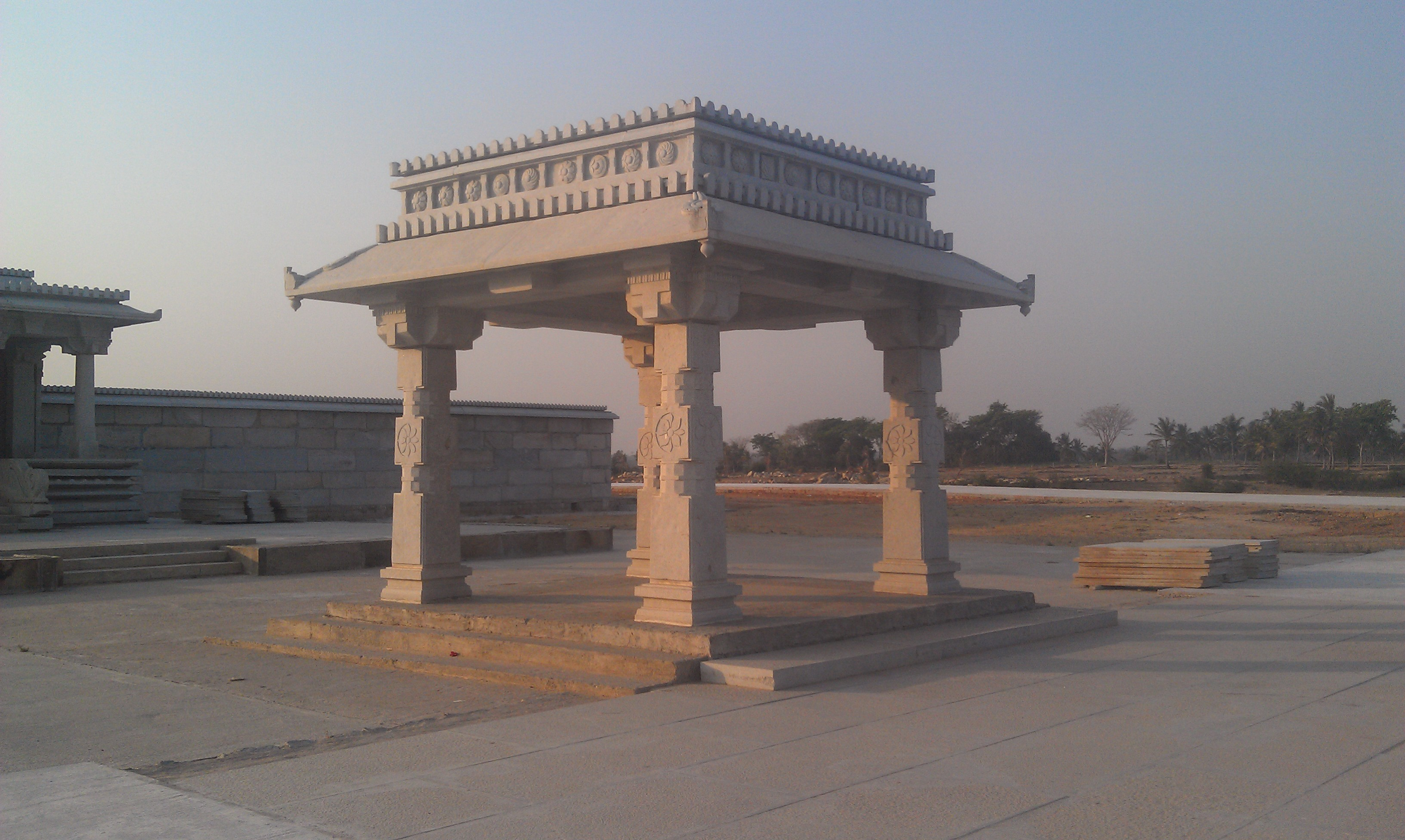
Entrance to the complex from the East

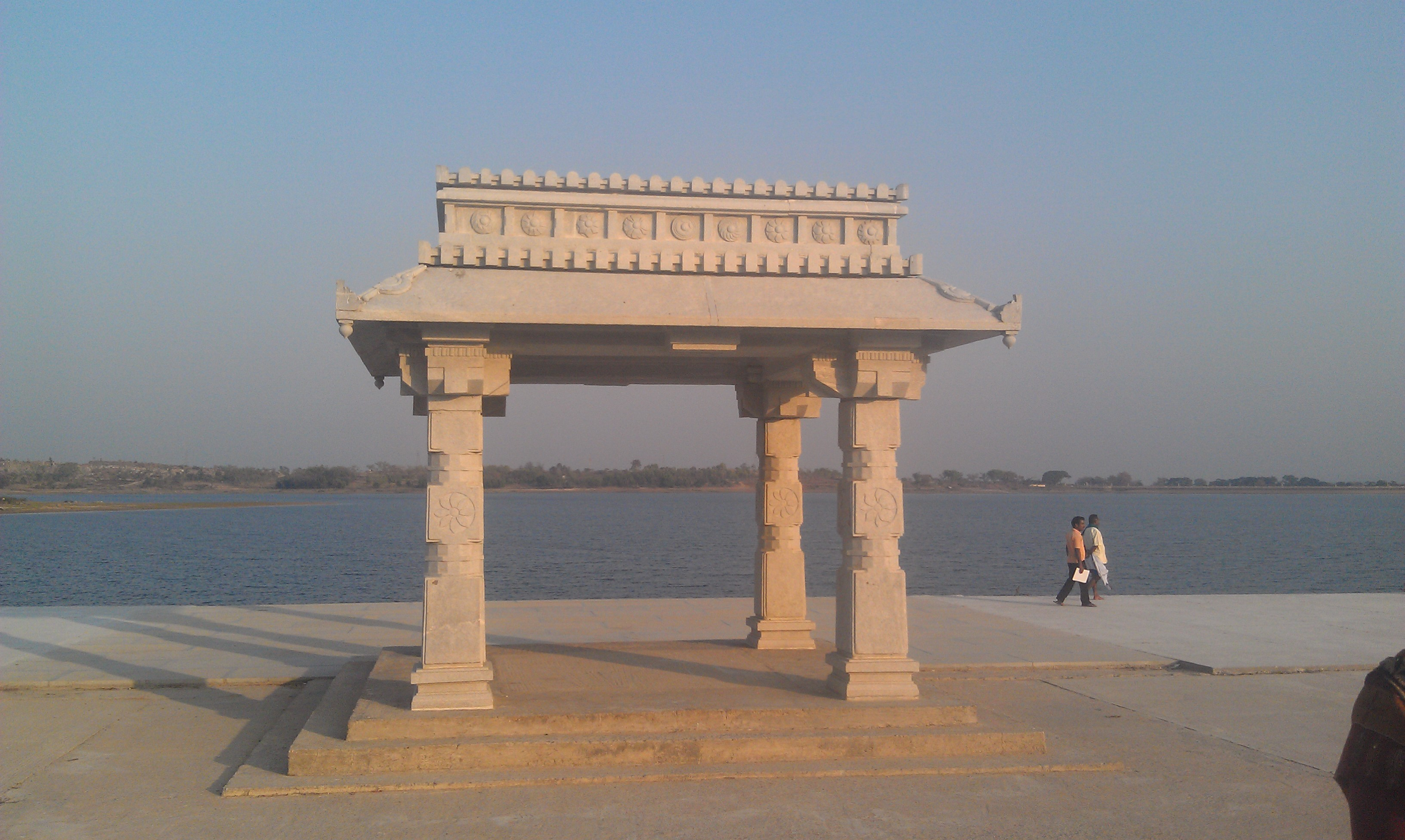
A View of the KRS reservoir from the temple entrance

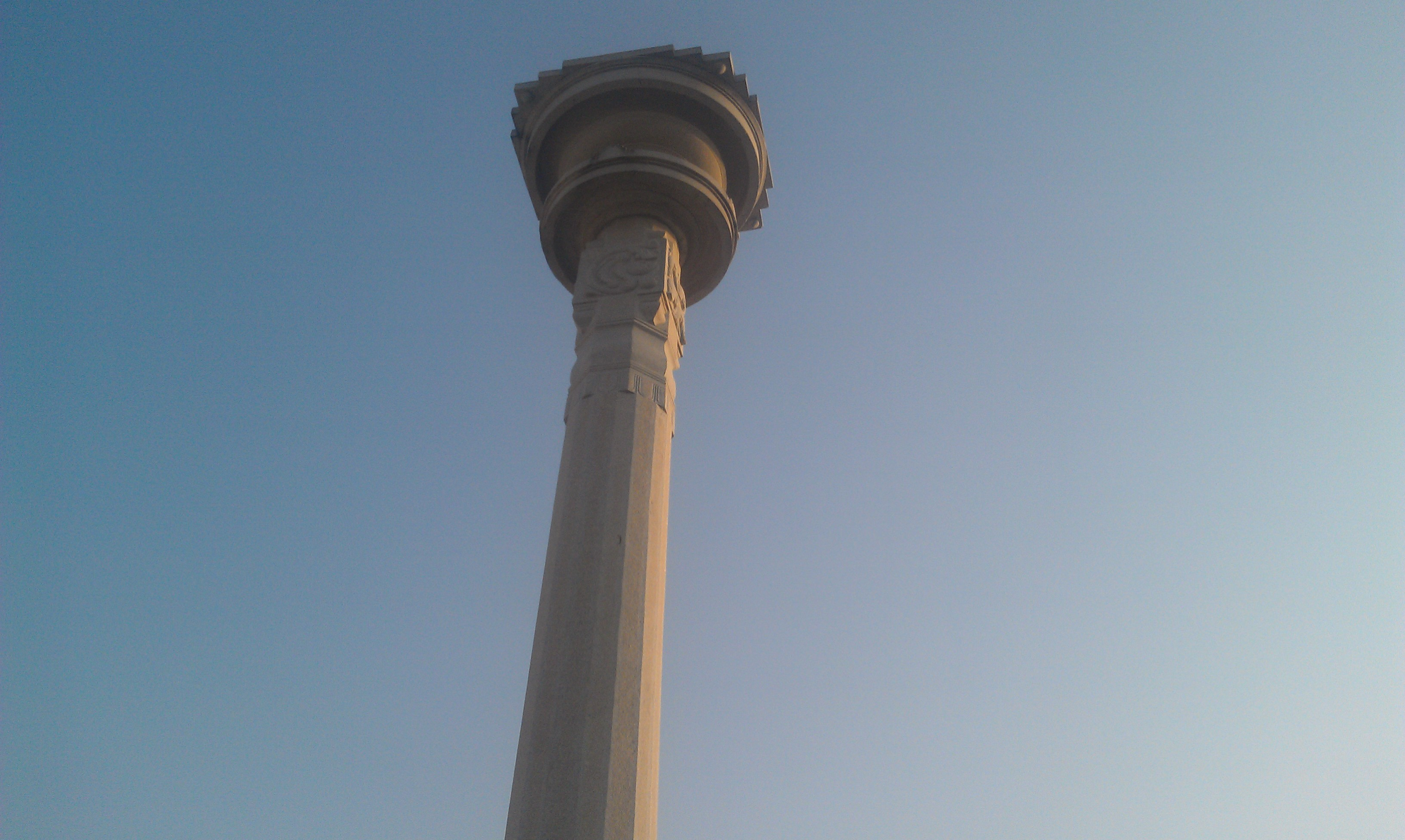
Deepa Sthambha (Lamp Post) used to light up the entrance at night

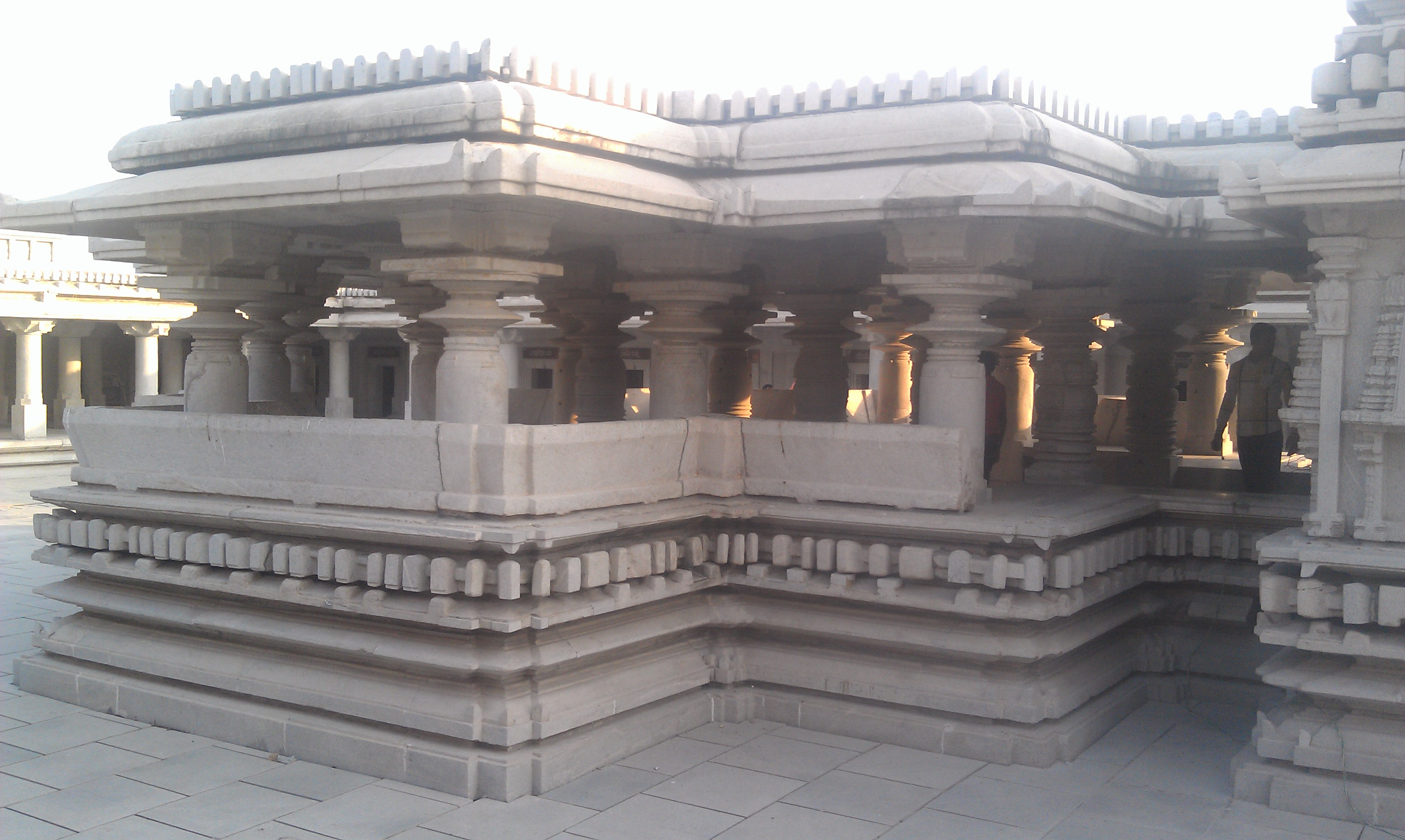
Typical Hoysala architecture of the Venugopalaswamy temple

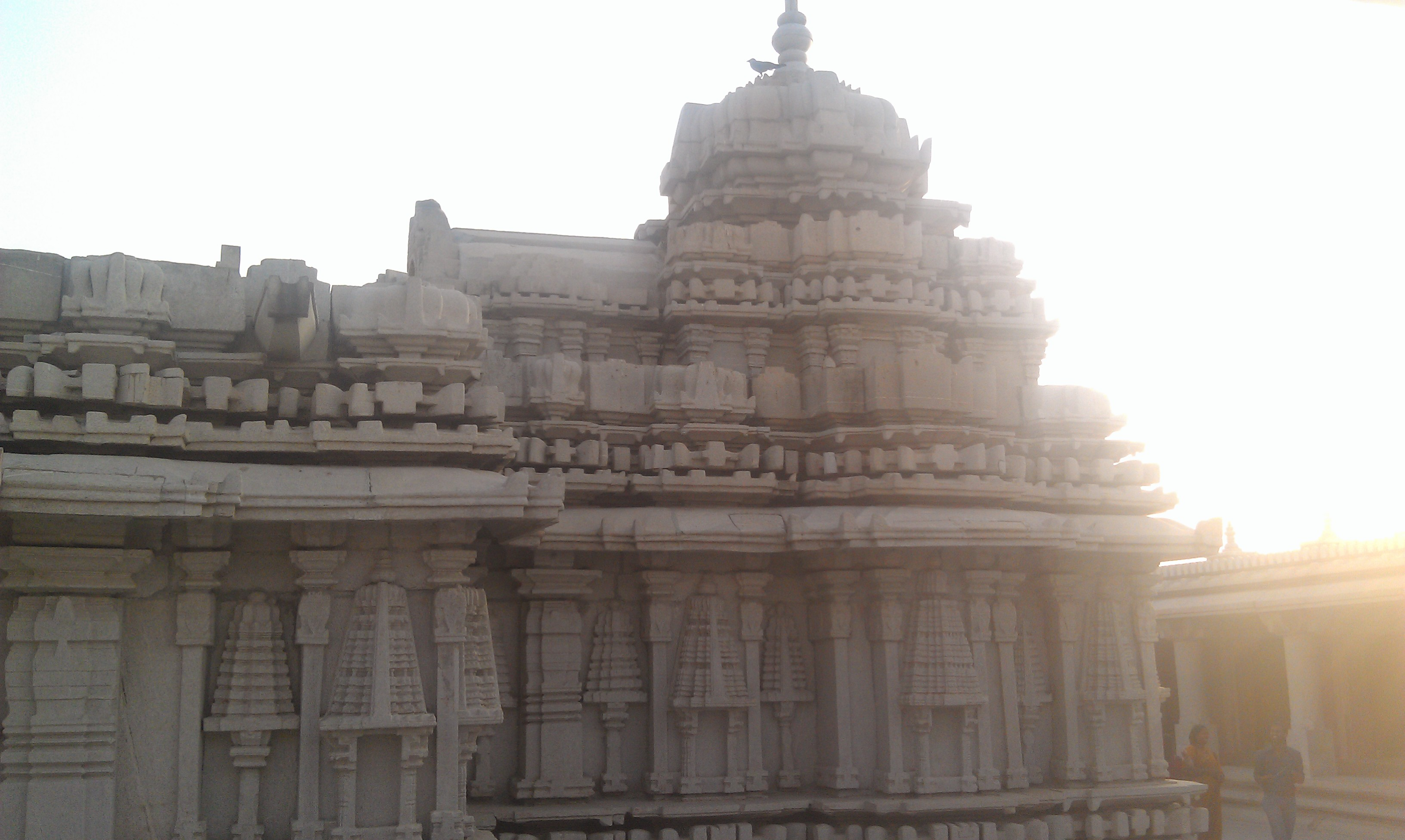
Venugopalaswamy temple Gopura

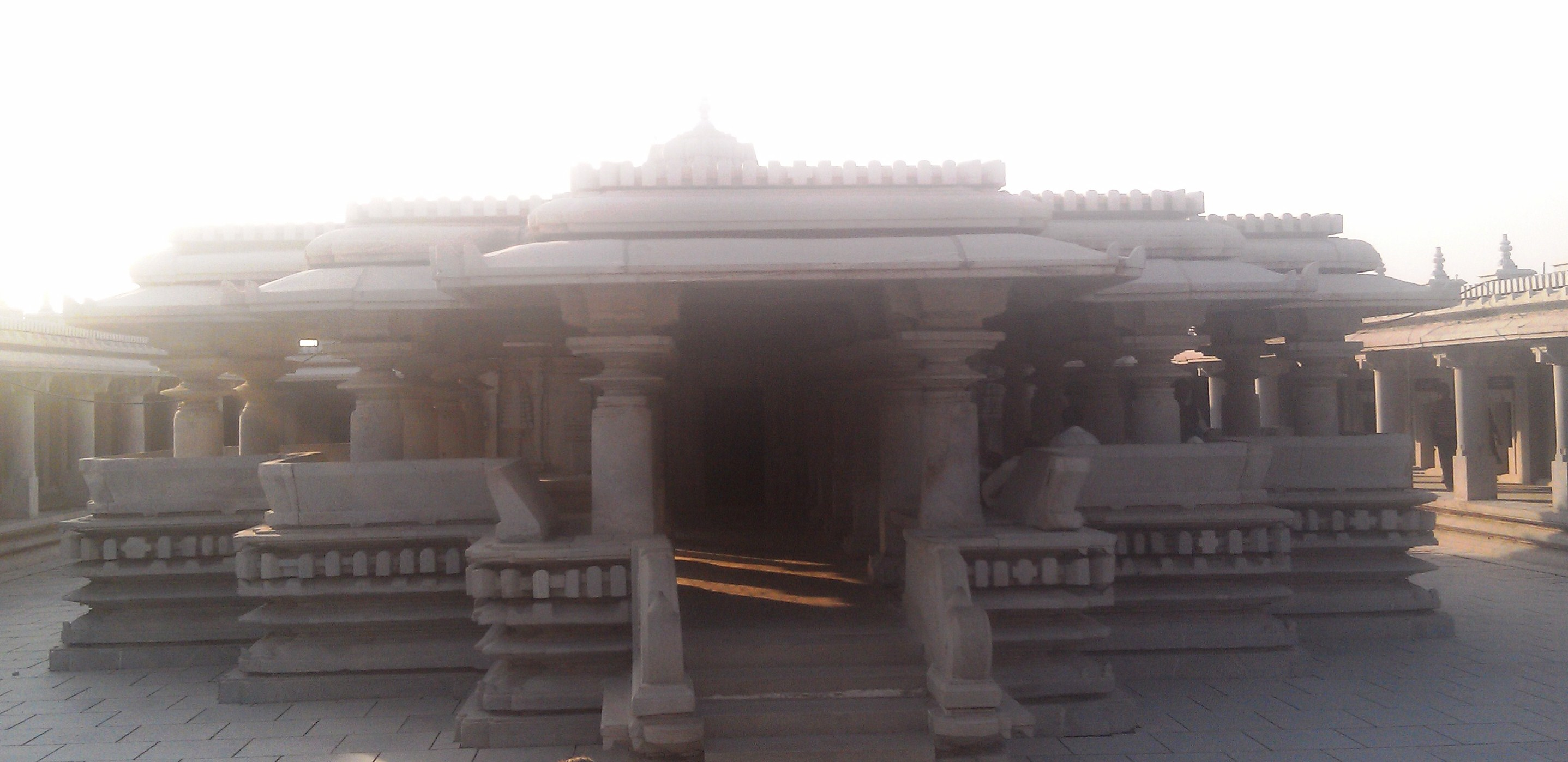
Venu Gopala Swamy Temple from the front

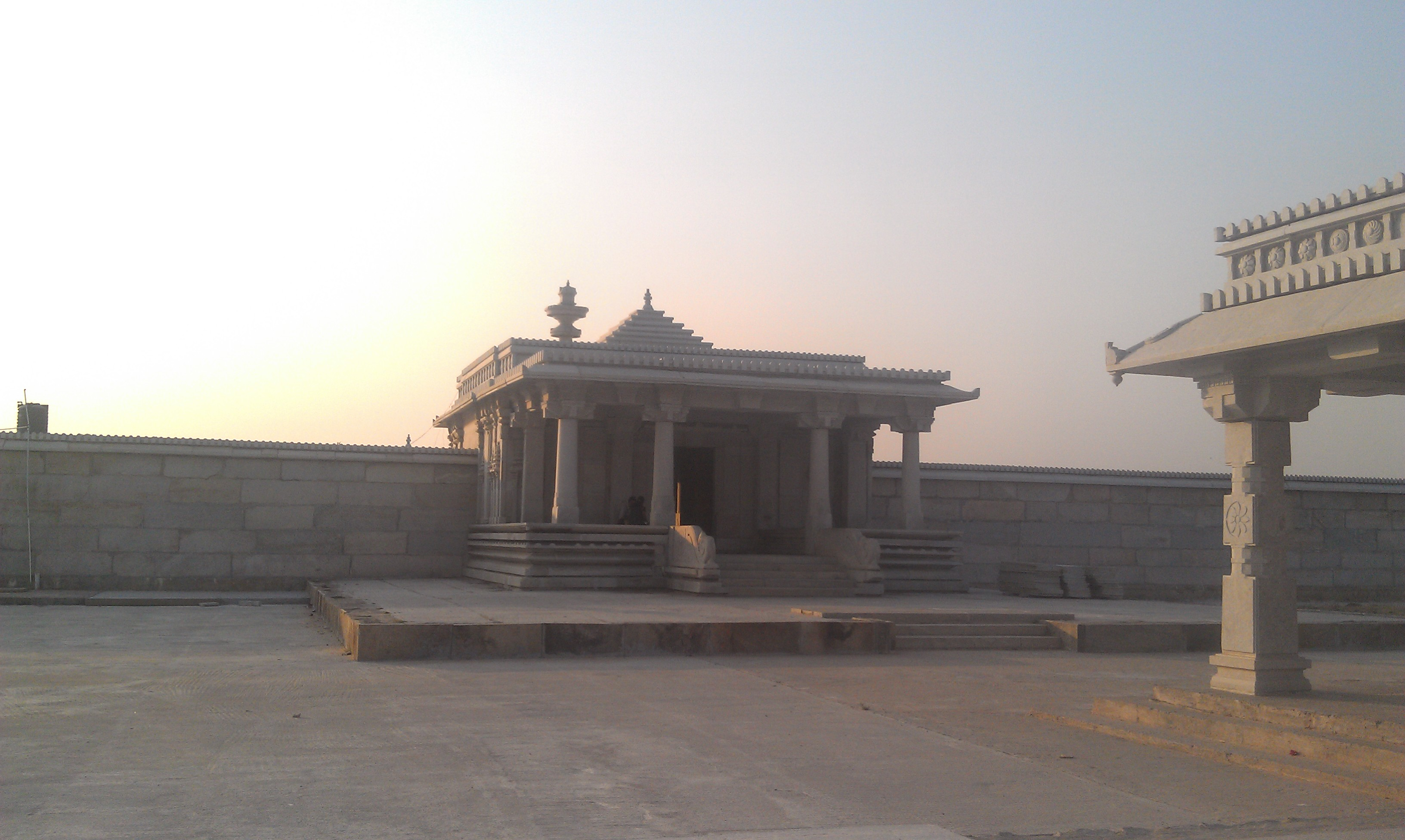
Venu Gopala Swamy Temple from the front

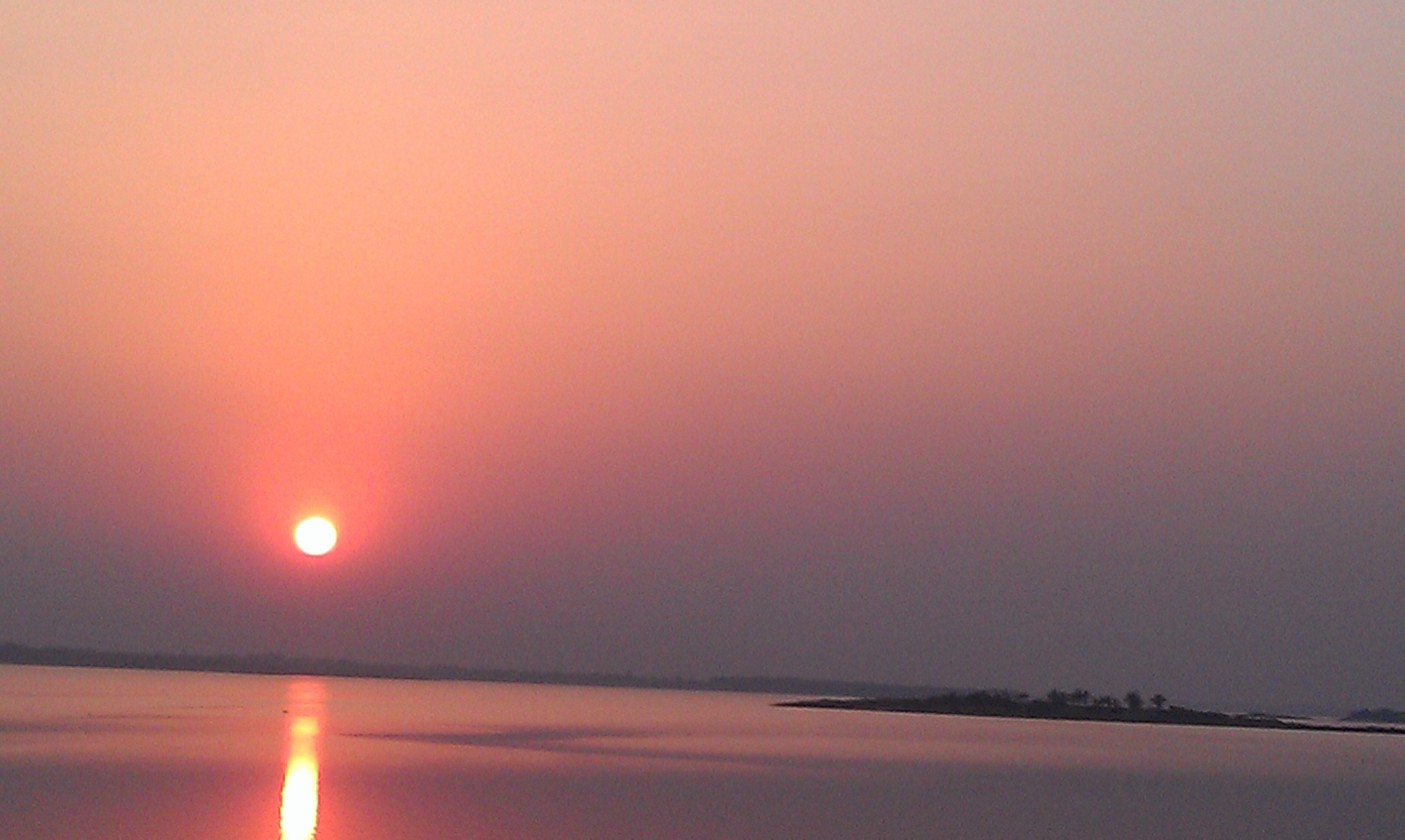
Sunset overlooking Krishna Raja Sagara as seen from the Venugopala Swamy temple
