= K. Anantharamu =

Indian writer

- Citizenship: Indian
- Occupations: Writer and Publisher
- Writing career
- Language: Kannada
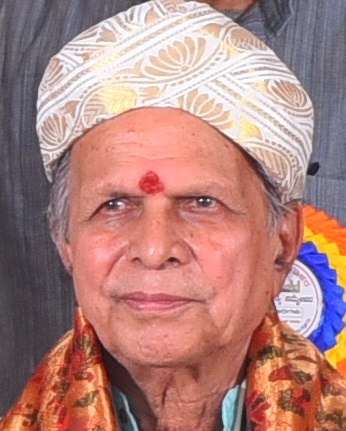
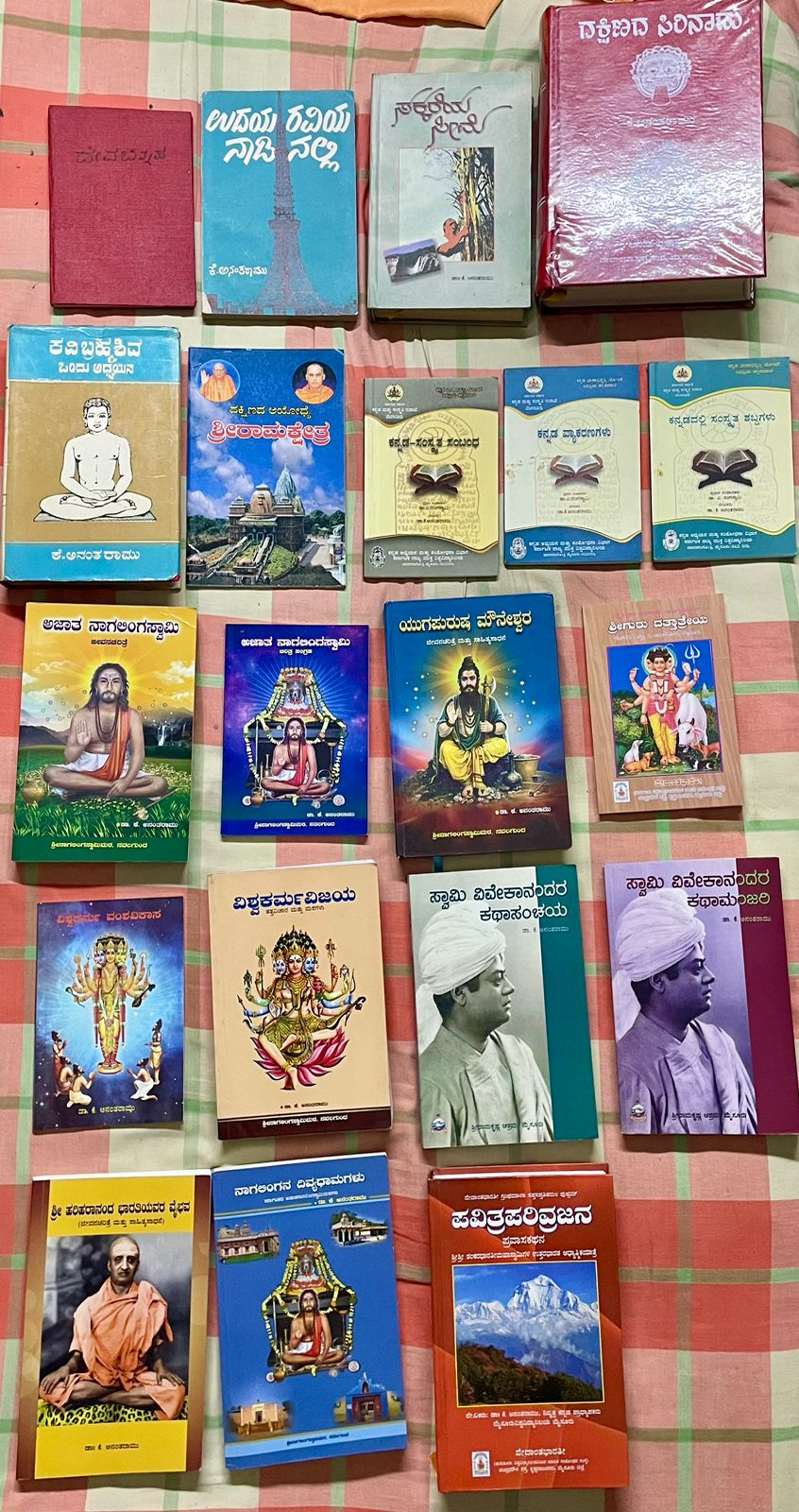
- Notable awards: Sahitya Akademi Award for Kannada Anantharamu K Works of K ANANTHARAMU

Anantharamu Krishnappa, born in Krishnaraja Nagara, Mysore District is a writer and a publisher. Father N.S. Krishnappa and mother Subbalakshmamma. He started his career at Anantapuram depot of Andhra Pradesh Road Transport Corporation and pursued his master's degree in Kannada from Maharaja's College, Mysuru, with the desire to become a teacher. He started his career as a lecturer in Maharaja's College. He has won the prestigious Sahitya Akademi Award for Kannada three times for his works. He earned his Doctorate in Philosophy for his work "Kavi Brahmashiva Ondu Adhyayana".

He published his first five books himself under the banner "Anantha Prakashana". He has also written several books under different publishers. These include 'Vivekananda's Fables' by Ramakrishna Ashrama, 'Ajata Nagalingaswamy' published by Navalgund Nagalingapura Mutt, 'Yuga Purusha Mouneshwara' and 'Sri Gurudattatreya' biography by Edathore Sri Yoganandeshwara Saraswathi Mutt, 'Kannada Sanskrit Sambandha' published by Open University, 'Kannada Sanskrit Sambandhagalu', 'Kannada Grammars', 'Sanskrit Words in Kannada' published by Open University. He is an orator and has delivered speeches in various parts of Karnataka.

He also won the Karnataka Rajyotsava Award in 2004 and the Ranna Sahitya Award in 2006.. He presided Mysuru District 15th Kannada Sahitya Sammelana. He was awarded with "Champaka Kalaa Ratna Award" in the year 2024.

== Bibliography ==
=== Travelogues ===
- Udaya Raviya Naadinalli - Expo 70, Japan travelogue (Kannada Sahitya Academy Award)
- Sakkareya Seeme - Karnataka State, Mandya District travelogue (Kannada Sahitya Academy Award)
- Dakshinada Sirinaadu - Karnataka State, Dakhisna Kannada district travelogue (Kannada Sahitya Academy Award)

=== Jainism ===
- Kavi Brahmashiva - Doctoral Research work.

=== Kannada Vachana Sahitya ===
- Devara Dasimayya - 101 Independent Vachanas
- Devabinnapa -

=== Kannada Education ===
- kannada-samskruta sambhandha - Karnataka State Open University
- kannada vyakaranagalu - Karnataka State Open University
- kannadadalli samskruta shabdhagalu - Karnataka State Open University

=== Hinduism ===
- Dakshinada Ayodhye - Sri Rama Kshetra
- Ajata Nagalingaswamy- Charitra Sangraha - Navalgund Nagalingapura Mutt
- Ajata Nagalingaswamy- Jeevana Charitre - Navalgund Nagalingapura Mutt
- Yugapurusha Mouneshwara - Navalgund Nagalingapura Mutt
- Vishwakarma Vamsha Vikasa - Navalgund Nagalingapura Mutt
- Vishwakarma Vijaya - Navalgund Nagalingapura Mutt
- Nagalingana Divya Dhamagalu - Navalgund Nagalingapura Mutt
- Sri Guru Dattatreya - Vedanta Bharati, Krishnaraja Nagara
- Pavitra Parivrajana - Vedanta Bharati, Krishnaraja Nagara
- Hariharananda Bharati Vaibhava -
- Swami Vivekanandara katha sanchaya- Ramakrishna Ashram, Mysuru
- Swami Vivekanandara katha sanchaya- Ramakrishna Ashram, Mysuru
