= N. Ranganatha Sharma =

Indian linguist (1916–2014)

Mahamahopadhyaya Vidvan N. Ranganatha Sharma (1916–2014) was a Sanskrit and Kannada scholar, particularly known for his erudition in grammar (vyākaraṇa) of both languages.

== Life ==
Ranganatha Sharma was born in the village of Nadahalli on January 7, 1916. He taught in Bangalore at the Chamarajendra Sanskrit College for several decades (1948 to 1976), where he was Professor of Vyākaraṇa. He was also a close associate of DVG (D. V. Gundappa).

== Work ==
=== Sanskrit works ===
Sharma's Sanskrit works include Bahubalivijayam (a Historical play, 1980) and Ekachakram (a mythological play, 1990); Guruparemitracaritam (1969) and Gommatesvarasuprabhatam (1981), and Gommatesa-panchakam.

=== Kannada works ===
Bhasantarapatha (1949), Laukika-nyayagalu (1959), Hosagannada Vyakarana, Valmikimunigala Hasyapravrtti, Varadahalli Sridhara Swamigalu, Sri Kamacandra (in the light of Bhasa, Kalidasa and Bhavabhuti, 1982), Suktivyapti (1991, Upanisattina Kathegalu (1993). Translated works: Valmikiramayana, Amarakosa (1970), Viduraniti (1973), the Xth Skandha of Srimad-bhagavata (1978), Srivisnupurana (1986), Vyasatatparyanirnaya, Srtisarasamuddharana of Totakacarya, Brahma-kanda of Vakyapadiyam, and Pancadasi of Vidyaranya.Edited works: Bhagavan¬namavali, Subhasitamanjari, and Srichamarajoktivilasaramayana.

He is noted for his translation of the entire Valmiki Ramayana into Kannada, which was published with a foreword by DVG himself. He also wrote works on the Vishnu Purana, Srimad Bhagavata, Amarakosha in three kāṇḍas, Bhartrhari and Sri Shankara Sookti Muktavali. He edited DVG's Marulamuniyana Kagga, a collection of poems which was published after DVG's death. Mr. Sharma has authored several books in Kannada and Sanskrit. He is a recipient of the national award for Sanskrit learning and has received the Rajyotsava Award. The Karnataka Samskrit University recently conferred an honorary doctorate on him. In his Laukika Nyayagalu, he explained 219 maxims in Kannada.

His works in Sanskrit include the historical play Bāhubalivijayam (1981), and the mythological play Ekacakram (1990), based on the Adi Parva of the Mahabharata. He was the author of more than 80 works, over 45 in Kannada and 10 in Sanskrit. He wrote Hosagannada Vyakarana, which was published in the year 2010.

== Honors received ==
He is a recipient of the Karnataka State Award, President’s Certificate of Honour, SHANKARA~KINKARA Prashasti of Sri Samsthana Gokarna Sri Ramachandrapur Mutt, Chunchasri Prasasti of Âdichunchanagiri Mahasamsthana, and the title Mahamahopadhyaya of Rashtriya Sanskrit Vidyapeeth, Tirupati.

== Awards ==
- Rajyotsava Award
- Best Teacher Award, at the State and National level
- First recipient of the DVG Memorial Award by the DVG Balaga
- Title of "Mahamahopadya" by the Tirupati Sanskrit University
- National award for proficiency in Sanskrit
- Honorary doctorate (Honoris Causa D. Litt. degree) from Karnataka Samskrit University, Bangalore.
- Book award for Sanskrit writing in 2010, from Karnataka Samskruta University.

== Death ==
Vidwan N. Ranganatha Sharma died on 25 January 2014 at his residence at Kuvempunagar, Mysore, at age 98.
