= Hasuru Honnu =

1977 novel by B. G. L. Swamy

- The Kannada novel,"ಹಸುರು ಹೊನ್ನು", Feb 2007 print
- Author: B G L Swamy
- Language: Kannada
- Genre: Science, Fiction
- Published: 1977 Kaavyaalaya Prakaashakaru, Bangalore.
- Publication place: India
- Media type: Print (Hardcover & Paperback)
- Followed by: Colleju Ranga

Hasuru Honnu ("Green Gold") is a botanical/autobiographical novel by B. G. L. Swamy. This book won him the Kendra Sahitya Academy award given by the Government of India. As a result, Gundappa and Swamy became the first father and son duo to win this award.

Hasuru honnu is a treatise on some familiar and unfamiliar botanical specimen, but it is also a travelogue enlivened by human drama and humor. Students of Advanced Botany undertake scientific tours in the company of their teachers for the identification and collection of botanical specimens. Swamy was deeply interested in history and the fine arts such as music, painting and architecture. Thus, as an artist and a scientist, he could explore and explain the world of botany in the light of a wider understanding. He describes the externals of a specimen with vivid precision and technical detail, but his account of the genus and species is only a prelude to a livelier non-technical account of its appearance, its locations and practical uses. Sometimes the reader is treated to an excursion into the past to discover how the specimen claimed attention by figuring in well-known literary works of antiquity.

The book thus unfolds before the reader the abundant riches and the endless variety of the botanical world and the hundred ways in which it helps humans. The human variety and the different characters all memorably visualized provide ample scope for portraying dramatic situations of all kinds, from the comic to the romantic. The book primarily deals with the world of plants, but it deals also with the world of humans. Hasiru honnu is as informative as it is delightful. It won him the 'Sahitya Akademi Award' in 1978.
