= Karpur Srinivasa Rao =

Indian civil engineer and public servant

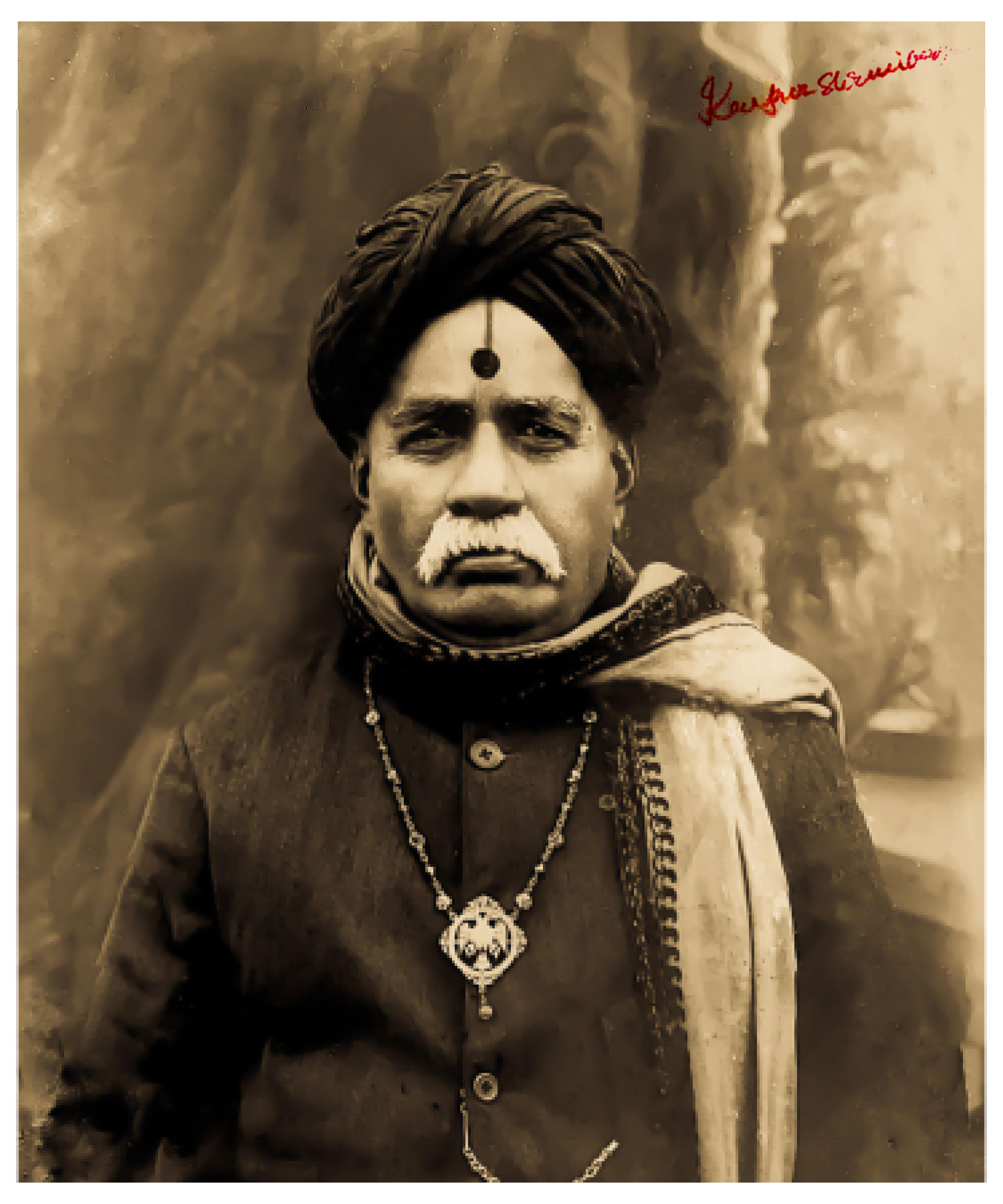
- Karpur Srinivasa Rao, c. 1920s
- Born: Karpur Srinivasa Rao; 27 July 1863; Bangalore, Mysore State, British India
- Died: 2 June 1932 (aged 68); Bangalore, Mysore State, British India
- Citizenship: Indian
- Occupations: Civil engineer, public servant
- Known for: Chief Engineer of Mysore State; KRS Dam; 1924 Cauvery Agreement; co-founder Kannada Sahitya Parishat
- Spouse: Venkubai
- Children: 6 (Karpur Subba Rao, Karpur Govinda Rao, Karpur Krishna Rao, Sheshibai Karpur aka Sharadabai Kaiwar, Ambabai Karpur aka Ambabai Rao, Bhagubai Karpur aka Bhagubai Taget)
- Parent(s): Karpur Subba Rao (Father), Jeevubai Karpur (Mother)
- Awards: Rajasabhabhushana (awarded by the Maharaja of Mysore State); Vidya Bhushana; M.R.A.S. (1914)

Karpur Srinivasa Rao (also rendered as Karpura Srinivasa Rao; spelled Shrinivasa in his own hand; (Note: The spelling Shrinivasa appears in the Bombay University Calendar (1886–87), his letter to the Dewan of Mysore dated 3 September 1908 (Karnataka State Archives, File No. 591), and the KRS Dam principal officers' plaque, which reads "Karpur Shrinivasa Rav".) 27 July 1863 – 2 June 1932), B.Sc., L.C.E., M.R.A.S., was a civil engineer and public servant who spent his career between the Bombay and Mysore government services. He is known primarily for three things: his tenure as Chief Engineer of Mysore State (1912–1917), during which the Krishna Raja Sagara Dam was built on the Cauvery River; his role leading the Mysore technical team in the negotiations that produced the Cauvery water-sharing agreement of 1924; and his work as a co-founder and long-serving Vice-President of the Kannada Sahitya Parishat.

D. V. Gundappa (1887–1975), a Kannada poet, philosopher, and journalist who received the Padma Bhushan in 1974, wrote a two-part biographical essay on him in his memoir Jnapakachitrashaale (1970). In it, Gundappa describes Karpur Srinivasa Rao's contribution to building the Kannada Sahitya Parishat as "herculean". That essay, published by the Gokhale Institute of Public Affairs and available in English translation, provides an independent account of his life and work. More than fifty years later, writer Gouri Satya devoted six pages to him in Mysurina Asamaanyaru (Mahima Prakashana, Mysuru, 2025), a published collection of biographical profiles of figures from Mysore, documenting his engineering career, his role in the Cauvery dispute, and his leadership of the Kannada Sahitya Parishat.

== Early life and education ==
Karpur Srinivasa Rao was born on 27 July 1863 in Bangalore. According to family tradition recorded by Subhoda M. Ramarao directly from Karpur Srinivasa Rao (KSR) (Tatvavada, November 1967), the surname Karpur derives from an ancestor who burned large quantities of camphor on the walls of the outer enclosure (mahaprakara) of the Tirupati temple each night, providing light to pilgrims; the family was thereafter known by the name of the sacred substance. After completing his Bachelor of Science at Central College, Bangalore, he went to Poona to study engineering at the College of Science, graduating in 1887 with a Licentiate in Civil Engineering (L.C.E.), Second Class. The Bombay University Calendar for 1886–87 notes him as winner of the Jamshedji Dorabji Naegaumvala Prize for the highest marks in Engineering Field and Office Work — the only prize of its kind awarded that year. Among those who had studied at the same college some years earlier was M. Visvesvaraya, with whom he would later work closely in Mysore.

== Career ==
=== Bombay Public Works Department (1887–1912) ===
On 5 March 1887, Karpur Srinivasa Rao joined the Public Works Department of the Bombay Presidency. He spent twenty-five years there, working across the Poona, Sindh, and Nashik divisions and eventually reaching the rank of Superintending Engineer. In the Poona Division he worked on the Khadakwasla Reservoir and the Mutha Canal system, and in Sindh he was posted to Sukkur. (Note: An earlier version of this article additionally stated that Srinivasa Rao worked alongside Visvesvaraya on a filtration system for the Sukkur Waterworks specifically, citing Visvesvaraya's 1951 memoir, p. 28. That claim could not be verified against the primary text on review of the memoir in August 2026 — his name does not appear in the chapters covering Visvesvaraya's own 1893–95 Sukkur posting or his later Bombay-service reminiscences — and has been removed pending independent confirmation from another source.)

It was also during these Bombay years that he designed the layout of Chamarajpet in Bangalore — the city's first planned residential extension, commissioned in 1892 by Maharaja Chamarajendra Wadiyar X. The design introduced a gridiron of wide roads and standardised plots that was new to Bangalore. Urban historian Janaki Nair, in her study of twentieth-century Bangalore, shows that this layout became the direct template for the extensions of Malleshwaram and Basavanagudi that followed the 1898 plague.

=== Chief Engineer of Mysore State (1912–1917) ===
When Visvesvaraya became Dewan of Mysore in 1912, he sought out Karpur Srinivasa Rao specifically for the post of Chief Engineer. A contemporary biographical sketch records the succession plainly: "when Sir M. Visweswarayya was made Dewan, Karpur Srinivasa Rao was appointed Chief Engineer in Mysore." The government's official history of the Mysore PWD confirms the appointment came "at the instance of the Dewan, Sir M. Visvesvaraya, for the execution of the Kaveri Reservoir Project." (Note: This citation was originally sourced by the article's principal contributor via the Karnataka State Archives' online portal, where the relevant page of the book was read and transcribed. The portal has since become intermittently inaccessible, and the transcription has not yet been independently re-verified against the physical text. It is retained here pending re-confirmation.) The appointment was formally gazetted in July 1913 as Notification No. 412. He assumed charge on 22 November 1912 (Note: Confirmed by the Mysore PWD Civil List and the Promotion Recommendation Roll, G.M. File No. 249 of 1913–14 (Karnataka State Archives).) and held the post until June 1917.

Visvesvaraya's own assessment of him survives in that same Promotion Recommendation Roll, filed for the year ending 31 December 1913. As Dewan, Visvesvaraya signed off on it in his own hand, writing that Srinivasa Rao "is an experienced officer and his professional ability is of a high order," that he "is hardworking, takes a keen interest in his work and bears a high character," and that "the Durbar are quite satisfied with the manner in which he performed the duties of Chief Engineer and Secretary to Government during the year."

One practical problem his tenure had to solve was a shortage of Portland cement during the First World War. Imported cement could not be procured, but construction of the dam could not stop. The PWD History records that under his guidance the department turned to surki mortar — lime mixed with burnt brick powder — as a substitute, and that it worked.

==== The Krishna Raja Sagara Dam ====
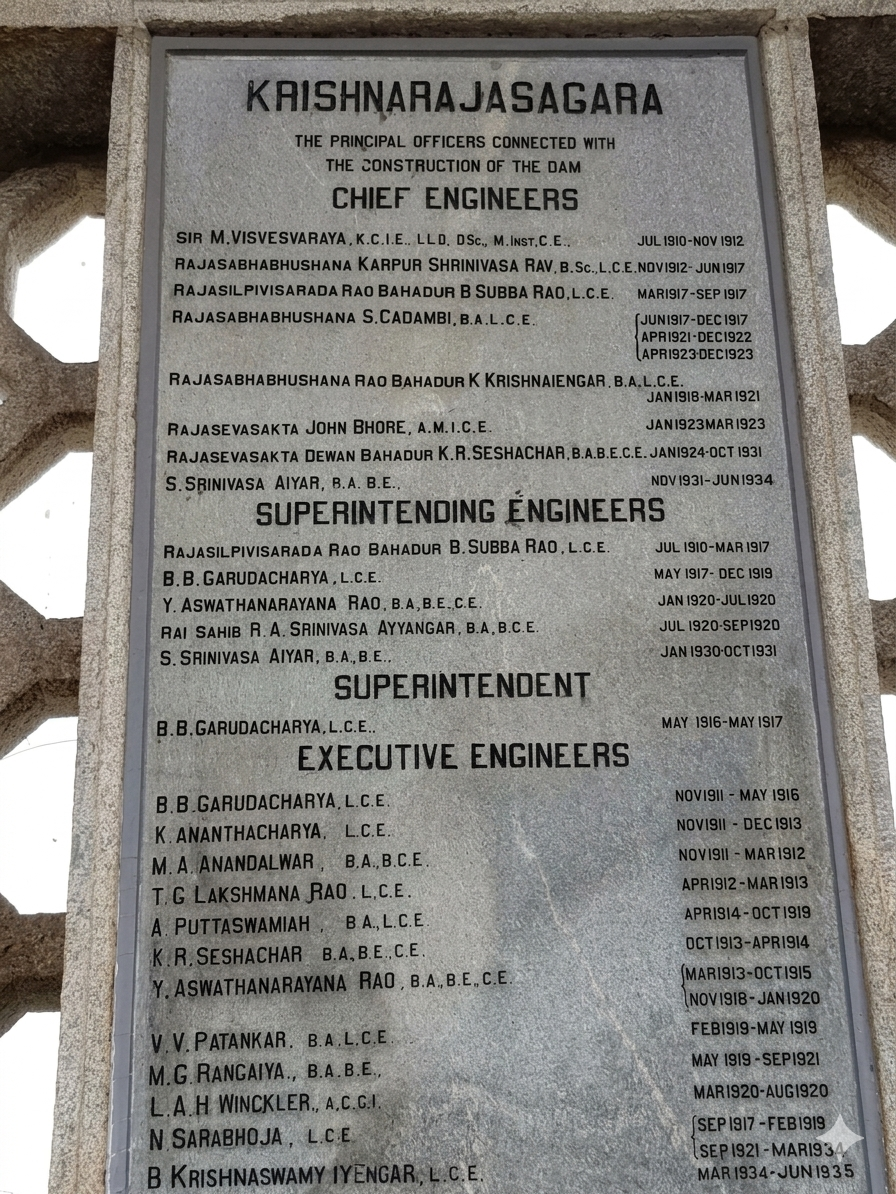
The principal officers' plaque at the KRS Dam entrance gate, listing Karpur Srinivasa Rao as Chief Engineer from November 1912 to June 1917.

The Krishna Raja Sagara (KRS) Dam was built across the Cauvery River near the village of Kannambadi in Mandya district. When it was completed in 1931 it was the largest reservoir in Asia. The entrance gate carries a granite plaque listing the principal officers; Karpur Srinivasa Rao is named as Chief Engineer, November 1912 to June 1917. (Note: KRS Dam principal officers' plaque, photographed by Prasanna Karpur. The plaque reads: "Rajasabhabhushana Karpur Shrinivasa Rav, B.Sc., L.C.E. — Nov 1912 – Jun 1917.")

==== The 1924 Cauvery Agreement ====
The Cauvery dispute was already on Karpur Srinivasa Rao's desk in his first year as Chief Engineer. His Promotion Recommendation Roll records that he was placed on special duty from 8 July to 18 August 1913, and again from 20 October 1913, "to represent the Mysore Government before the Court of Arbitration appointed by the Government of India" in the dispute between Mysore and Madras over the river's waters. That arbitration did not resolve matters. After his retirement he was drawn back into the negotiations, leading the Mysore technical team — alongside Chief Engineer Cadambi — through talks held at Fort St. George, Madras, from 1921 to 1924. Facing them across the table were W.J. Howley, K. Srinivas Iyengar (later Vice-Chancellor of Madras University), and C. P. Ramaswamy Iyer.

T. Ramakrishnan, in his 2024 account of the dispute published by The Hindu Group, records that "apart from Cadambi, Mysore was represented by Karpur Srinivasa Rao, former Chief Engineer." The agreement the two sides eventually signed, on 18 February 1924 at Fort St. George, set the KRS reservoir level at 124.80 feet, fixed the effective storage at 44,827 million cubic feet, and was to remain in force for fifty years. It was signed by A.R. Banerji, Dewan of Mysore, and P. Hawkins, PWD Secretary of Madras. Following the agreement, Karpur Srinivasa Rao and Cadambi received the title Rajasabhabhushana from Maharaja Krishna Raja Wadiyar IV.

== Kannada Sahitya Parishat ==
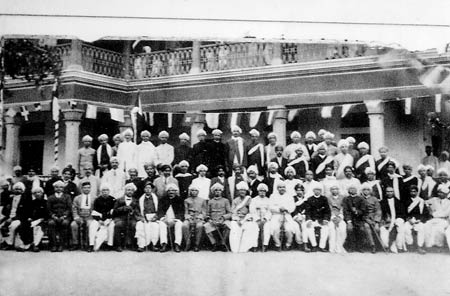
Participants of the founding conference of the Kannada Sahitya Parishat, Bangalore, 3 May 1915. Karpur Srinivasa Rao (seated, fifth from left) was one of the four founding members.

On 3 May 1915, Karpur Srinivasa Rao joined H. V. Nanjundaiah, P.S. Achyuta Rao, and R. Raghunath Rao in founding the Kannada Sahitya Parishat (KSP) in Bangalore. He drafted the organisation's constitution and byelaws. From 1918 until his death in 1932 — fourteen years — he served as its Vice-President. Since the formal Presidency was held as an honorary position by members of the Mysore royal family, the Vice-President ran the organisation day to day. He presided over the 5th Kannada Sahitya Sammelana at Hassan in 1919.

Raising money for a permanent building was a protracted undertaking. In August 1926 he wrote to the Palace asking for the Maharaja's support; the Palace replied on 14 September 1926 committing a donation of Rs. 5,000 towards an estimated cost of Rs. 30,000, subject to certain conditions (letter No. 58, signed by T. Thamboo Chetty). By the time the foundation stone was laid on 12 April 1931, the money had been assembled. Karpur Srinivasa Rao laid the stone himself, though by then he was partially paralysed. The building was completed in 1933, the year after his death, and named Sri Krishnarajendra Karnataka Sahitya Parishanmandira.

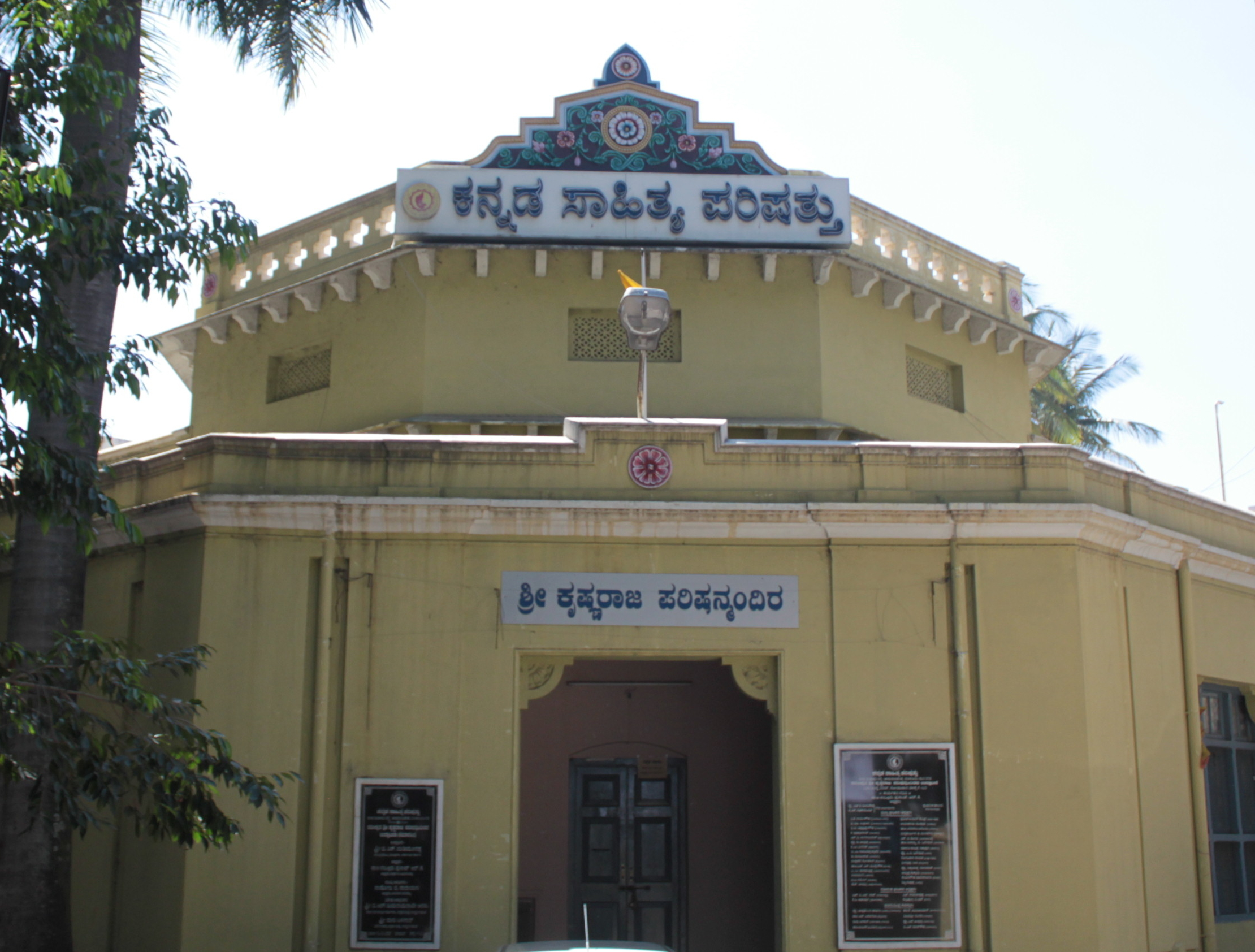
The Sri Krishnarajendra Karnataka Sahitya Parishanmandira, the permanent headquarters of the KSP, completed 1933.

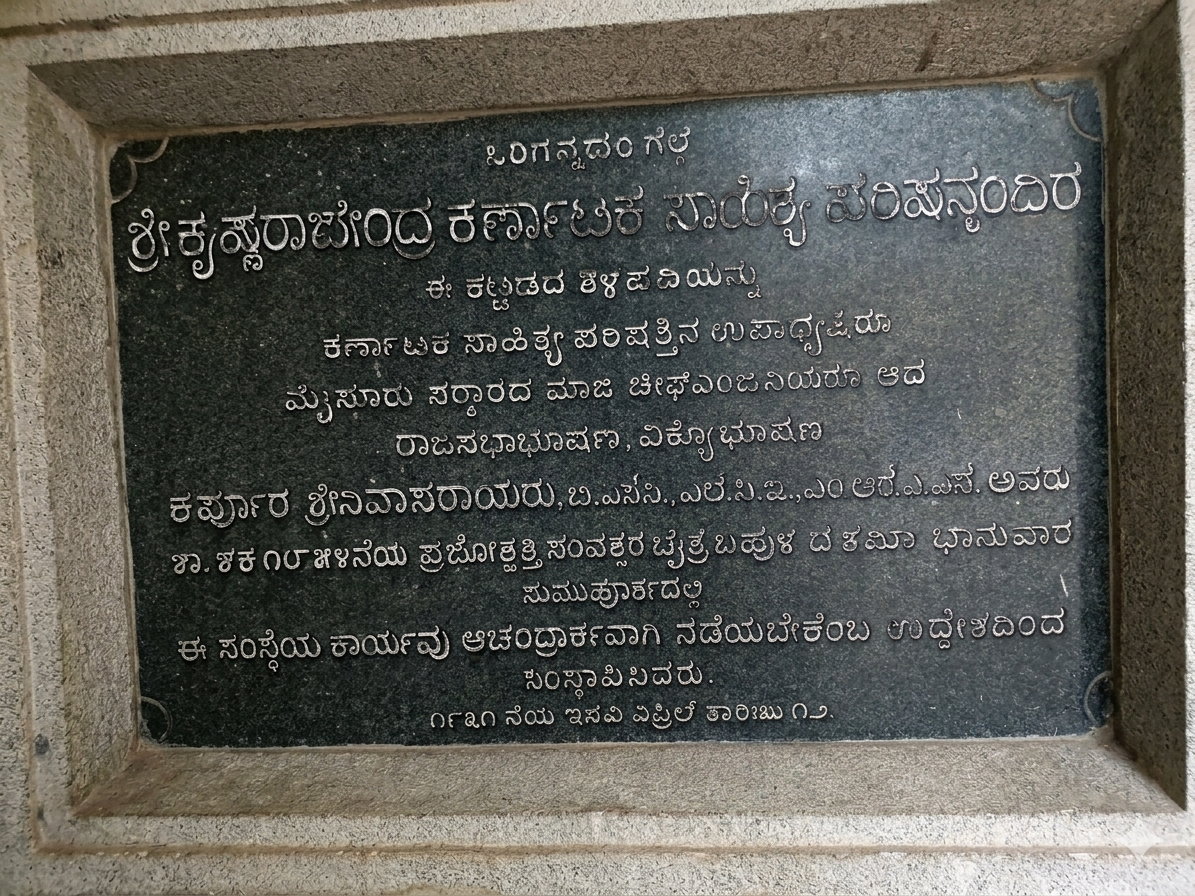
Foundation stone plaque at the KSP building, 12 April 1931, recording KSR's post-nominals as B.Sc., L.C.E., M.R.A.S.

D.V. Gundappa, who knew him personally, wrote in Jnapakachitrashaale: "He used to collate money and members from anywhere and everywhere possible. He knew all the scholars of the state. He never missed even a single conference." The KSP's own centenary website records that no Vice-President before or since conducted as many annual Sammelanas during their tenure.

== Personal life ==
Karpur Srinivasa Rao married Venkubai; they had six children. He was a Madhwa Vaishnava with a serious interest in Sanskrit scholarship, for which he received the title Vidya Bhushana. In 1914 he was elected a Member of the Royal Asiatic Society of Great Britain and Ireland, at the Society's Anniversary Meeting of 12 May, with Lord Reay in the chair. His full post-nominals — B.Sc., L.C.E., M.R.A.S. — are carved on the KSP foundation stone plaque he laid in 1931. (Note: Foundation stone plaque, Sri Krishnarajendra Karnataka Sahitya Parishanmandira. Photo held by Prasanna Karpur.)

In retirement, he also served as Convenor of the Committee of Dharmadarsis (temple trustees) for two Sri Anjaneyaswami temples in Bangalore — one at Fort Gate, and one at the Western Fort Gate near the Minto Ophthalmic Hospital. A notification in The Mysore Gazette of 12 June 1930 records that his resignation from this convenorship was accepted, with T. Appu Rao, Advocate, Bangalore City, appointed in his place. This notification is also the earliest independently dated documentary use of the title Rajasabhabhushana found for him, predating both the 1931 KSP foundation stone plaque and the undated Dakshini MarathiAdda profile.

== Death ==
Karpur Srinivasa Rao died on 2 June 1932 in Bangalore.

== Legacy ==
The Krishna Raja Sagara Dam remains in active use today, serving as the main source of drinking water for Mysore, Mandya, and Bengaluru — roughly 1,450 million litres a day reach the city through the Cauvery Water Supply Scheme. The 1924 Cauvery Agreement he helped negotiate lasted its full fifty-year term and left behind a technical framework — the Rules of Regulation and the gauging standards for the KRS — that S. Guhan describes as still shaping how Cauvery water calculations are made between Karnataka and Tamil Nadu.

The gridiron street layout he introduced at Chamarajpet in 1892 extended beyond that neighbourhood. Janaki Nair's history of twentieth-century Bangalore shows it was taken up directly as the model for Malleshwaram and Basavanagudi after the 1898 plague.

The Kannada Sahitya Parishat he co-founded in 1915 now has over 500,000 lifetime members. Its 86th annual Sammelana, held at Haveri in January 2023, drew more than 300,000 people over three days.

== Sources ==
=== Primary sources ===
- Mysore Public Works Department Civil List. Mysore: Government of Mysore. 1912.
- Bombay University Calendar 1886. Bombay: Thacker & Co. 1886.
- "Mysore Gazette, Notification No. 412: Appointment of Chief Engineer". The Mysore Gazette, January–October 1913. Bangalore: Government Press. July 1913.
- "Notification No. C. 3. L. 2863—29-30, dated 9th June 1930: Resignation of Rajasabhabhushana Karpur Srinivasa Rao as Convenor, Committee of Dharmadarsis". The Mysore Gazette, Part IV. Bangalore: Government Press: 587. 12 June 1930.
- "Annual award of a prize of Rs. 100 by Mr. Karpur Srinivasa Rao". Karnataka State Archives, Bangalore (via archive.org). September 1908.
- Yearly Promotion Recommendation Roll of the Engineer Establishment: Mr. Karpur Shrinivasarao, B.Sc., L.C.E., for the year ending 31 December 1913 (Archival document. Karnataka State Archives, Bangalore. G.M. File No. 249 of 1913–14, Serial Nos. 1–2. Physical scan held by Prasanna Karpur.). Bangalore: General and Revenue Secretariat, Government of Mysore. 1913.
- "Notes of the Quarter: Anniversary Meeting, 12 May 1914". Journal of the Royal Asiatic Society of Great Britain and Ireland. July 1914.

=== Published sources ===
- History of the Mysore Public Works Department (1856–1956). Bangalore: Government Press. 1956. OCLC 569234854.
- Gundappa, D. V. (1970). "Essay 12: Karpura Srinivasa Rao (Parts 1 and 2)". Jnapakachitrashaale, Volume 3: Sahityopasakaru (in Kannada). Bangalore: Gokhale Institute of Public Affairs.
- Guhan, S. (1993). The Cauvery River Dispute: Towards Conciliation. Madras: Madras Institute of Development Studies in association with Frontline. ISBN 9788185966014.
- Nair, Janaki (2005). The Promise of the Metropolis: Bangalore's Twentieth Century. New Delhi: Oxford University Press. ISBN 9780195672084.
- Ashwathanarayana, G. (2015). Kannada Sahitya Parishattu 100: Ondu Aitihasika Adhyayana [Kannada Sahitya Parishat 100: A Historical Study] (in Kannada). Bengaluru: Kannada Sahitya Parishat. ISBN 9788193077306.
- Ramakrishnan, T. (2024). Cauvery: A Long-Winded Dispute. Chennai: The Hindu Group. ISBN 9789393875969.
- Jayakumar, H. (2023). The Cauvery Water Dispute: A Study in Conflict Resolution. Bhopal: Nitya Publications. ISBN 9789394837751.
- Kannada Sahitya Parishattinge Suvarna Mahotsava (Golden Jubilee Volume) (in Kannada). Bangalore: Kannada Sahitya Parishat. 1965.
- Satya, Gouri (2025). Mysurina Asamaanyaru (in Kannada). Mysuru: Mahima Prakashana. pp. 162–167. ISBN 9788198100092.

Note: Satya (2025) renders the subject's title as "Rajabhasha Bhushana". The correct form, "Rajasabhabhushana", is confirmed by five independent primary sources including the KRS Dam principal officers' plaque and the KSP foundation stone plaque (both physical inscriptions made during KSR's lifetime), the Promotion Recommendation Roll (Karnataka State Archives), and DVG's published essay. The Satya book is cited here only for biographical coverage, not for the title.

- Ramarao, Subhoda M. (November 1967). "ಮಾಧ್ವ ಧುರೀಣ ದಿ. ಕರ್ಪೂರ ಶ್ರೀನಿವಾಸರಾಯರು" [Madhwa Distinguished: The Late Karpur Srinivasarayaru]. Tatvavada (in Kannada). Bangalore.

Note: Written by a neighbour of KSR who recorded the account directly from KSR in personal conversations. The journal was founded by Ramarao with KSR's financial support.

- Chaturvedi, Hari Rao R. (2020). Rajasabhabhushana Sri Karpur Srinivasa Rao: To My Knowledge (Unpublished manuscript).
- "KRS reaches maximum level, water security for Bengaluru ensured". The Hindu. 2023-08-20.
- "86th Kannada Sahitya Sammelana, Haveri". The Hindu. 2023-01-07.
- "Rajabhasha Bhushana Karpur Srinivasa Rao". Dakshini Marathi Adda. 2020.
- "ನಮ್ಮ ಪರಿಷತ್ತು (About the Parishat)". Kannada Sahitya Parishat (in Kannada).
- "Birth of Kannada Sahitya Parishat". Star of Mysore. 2015.
- "ನಮ್ಮ ಮೈಸೂರಿನ ಅಸಾಮಾನ್ಯರು: ರಾಜಸಭಾ ಭೂಷಣ ಕರ್ಪೂರ ಶ್ರೀನಿವಾಸರಾವ್". Mysuru Mithra (in Kannada). 2024-07-07.
- "History, Food, And Shopping — Make Time For Chamarajpet". MetroSaga. 2019.
- "Chamarajapet: Meet Bengaluru's first modern residential layout". Asianet Newsable. 2018.
- "Dr. D.V. Gundappa (Scholar and Journalist)". Indian Philatelics. Reproduces information folder issued by the India Posts & Telegraph Department, Government of India.

== See also ==
- M. Visvesvaraya
- Krishna Raja Sagara
- Kannada Sahitya Parishat
- Cauvery water dispute
- Chamarajpet
- Royal Asiatic Society of Great Britain and Ireland
