= Institute for Public Affairs =

Institute for Public Affairs may refer to:

- Cornell Institute for Public Affairs
- Institute for Public Affairs (Slovakia) (IVO), a Slovakian think tank and non-governmental organization
- Institute for Public Affairs (U.S.), publisher of In These Times magazine
- Institute of Public Affairs of the University of Chile
- Couchiching Institute on Public Affairs
- Georgian Institute of Public Affairs (GIPA), in the Republic of Georgia
- Gokhale Institute of Public Affairs
- Institute of Public Affairs, Australia
- Institute of Public Affairs, Poland
