= Srimad Bhagavad Gita Tatparya =

1967 exposition by D.V. Gundappa

Srimad Bhagavad Gita Tatparya is a modern exposition of the meaning and significance of the Bhagavadgita (1967) by D. V. Gundappa. It received the Sahitya Akademi Award in 1967.

The very process of its composition is significant, D. V. Gundappa expounded his interpretation over a year and a half to his listeners at a study circle and students made notes; later, the notes were revised and rewritten. This gives the work clarity and flavour of the spoken word and doubts and question reckoned with.

The primary purpose of the author is to bring out the relevance of the Gita to the common man even in his everyday life. The Gita is not repository of recondite philosophy but, as the subtitle of the book shows(Jeevan Dharma Yoga), it is an intensely relevant guide to every man. The author steers clear of sectarian interpretations in the main body of the work, recognizes the pattern natural to conversation in the Gita, and expounds the great work as exploration of the nature of 'Dharma' which can guide, comfort, sustain and strengthen the individual. According to Gundappa, the Gita faces unequivocally the challenges of both individual and social existence and provides the illumination to find one's way in the maze of actual life.
