= B. G. L. Swamy =

Indian botanist and writer

- Born: Bengaluru Gundappa Lakshminarayanaswami; 5 February 1918; Bangalore, Mysore State, British India
- Died: 2 November 1980 (aged 62); Mysore, Karnataka, India
- Occupations: Professor; botanist; writer; historian
- Spouse: Vasantha
- Writing career
- Period: 1945–1980
- Genres: Fiction; botany; history; literature; epigraphy
- Subject: Various Subjects
- Notable works: ಹಸುರು ಹೊನ್ನು (Hasuru Honnu); ಕಾಲೇಜು ರಂಗ (College Ranga); ಅಮೆರಿಕದಲ್ಲಿ ನಾನು (Amerikadalli Naanu); ತಮಿಳು ತಲೆಗಳ ನಡುವೆ (Tamilu Talegala Naduve)
- Movement: Navodaya

Bengaluru Gundappa Lakshminarayana Swamy (5 February 1918 – 2 November 1980) was an Indian botanist and Kannada writer who was professor, head of the botany department and principal of Presidency College, Chennai. He was the son of D. V. Gundappa, an Indian philosopher and writer in the Kannada language.

== Early life and career ==
Swamy was born in 1916 to D. V. Gundappa and Bhagirathamma. He studied at Central College in Bangalore and obtained his bachelor's degree in botany. After this, and at the suggestion of his father, he began to study the embryology of orchids at home after obtaining a second-hand microscope, a microtome and some basic laboratory tools. He received a PhD from the University of Mysore in 1947 and had a brief post-doctoral period at Harvard University under Irving Widmer Bailey.

From 1953, he served as a professor of botany (and later the principal) at Presidency College, Chennai.

He briefly served as a visiting professor of the botany department at the University of Mysuru during 1979–80.

Notably, D. V. Gundappa and B. G. L. Swamy became the first father-son duo to win the Sahitya Academy Award. While conferring the award to Dr. Swamy, the then-president of Sahitya Akademi, Umashankar Joshi, described him as "the famous son of a famous father".

B. P. Radhakrishna has authored a book about the life and achievements of Dr. Swamy.

== Research ==
Swamy's primary research area was plant anatomy, particularly the structure of connections between plants' roots and stems. He discovered several plant species, including Ascarina maheshwarii and Sarcandra irvingbaileyi, which he named after two of his teachers. In 1976, he was awarded the Birbal Sahni gold medal by the Government of India for his work in botany.

== Writings ==
Swamy's literary works encompass a wide range of topics. Many of them are related to botany and introduce botanical concepts to the layperson. A few of his books cover plants used in everyday life in a scientific manner, such as Namma Hotteyalli Dakshina Amerika (South America in Our Stomach).

Other works by Swamy pertain to literature, and some of them are partially autobiographical, dealing with his experiences as a professor and principal. Apart from being an acclaimed botanist, B. G. L. Swamy was widely respected in the history and literary circles.

He extensively studied and researched the histories and literature of the Kannada and Tamil Languages. His book Tamilu Talegala Naduve (Among the Tamil Heads) is devoted to examining theories pertaining to the language's origins (examining the claims that were being made in those days by the Dravidian parties) and mostly debunking them. In this book, he debunks some of the theories put forward by Tamil linguists and historians such as Iravatham Mahadevan and Nilkanta Shastri. He raised questions regarding gaping holes and contradictions he discovered in their theories.

According to N. K. Ramasheshan, Dr. Swamy authored more than 300 research articles in English, Spanish, German, Latin and French that were published in well-known papers of international repute.

=== Hasuru Honnu ===
His book Hasuru Honnu (Green Gold) won him the Kendra Sahitya Academy award given by the Government of India in 1978. With that, Gundappa and Swamy became the first father and son duo to win this prestigious award.

Hasuru Honnu is a treatise on some familiar and unfamiliar botanical species. It is also a travelogue enlivened by human drama and humor. Students of advanced botany undertake scientific tours in the company of their teachers for the identification and collection of botanical specimens. Swamy was a gifted man of letters with an observant eye, a sense of humour and, at the same time, a deep interest in history and the fine arts such as music, painting and architecture. Thus, as an artist and a scientist, he could explore and explain the world of botany in the light of a wider understanding. He describes the externals of a specimen with vivid precision and technical detail, but his account of the genus and species is only a prelude to a livelier, non-technical account of its appearance, its locations and its practical uses. Sometimes the reader discovers how the specimen claimed attention by appearing in well-known literary works of antiquity.

The book presents the diversity of the botanical world, as well as numerous ways in which plants relate to human life. Its depiction of varied human personalities and characters provides opportunities to portray situations of all kinds, from comic to romantic. The book primarily focuses on the world of plants but it deals also with the world of humans. Hasuru honnu combines informational content with an egaging presentation.

=== Books ===
- ಹಸುರು ಹೊನ್ನು (Hasuru Honnu)
- ಕಾಲೇಜು ರಂಗ (Colleju Ranga)
- ಕಾಲೇಜು ತರಂಗ (Colleju Taranga)
- ಪ್ರಾಧ್ಯಾಪಕನ ಪೀಠದಲ್ಲಿ (Pradhyapakana Peethadalli)
- ತಮಿಳು ತಲೆಗಳ ನಡುವೆ (Tamilu Talegala Naduve)
- ನಮ್ಮ ಹೊಟ್ಟೆಯಲ್ಲಿ ದಕ್ಷಿಣ ಅಮೇರಿಕ (Namma Hotteyalli Dakshina Amerika)
- ಪಂಚಕಲಶ ಗೋಪುರ (Pancha Kalasha Gōpura)
- ಅಮೇರಿಕದಲ್ಲಿ ನಾನು (Americadalli Naanu)
- ಮೈಸೂರು ಡೈರಿ (Mysooru Diary) (incomplete)
- ದೌರ್ಗಂಧಿಕಾಪಹರಣ (Dourgandhikāpaharana)
- ಫಲಶ್ರುತಿ (Phalashruthi)
- ಸಾಕ್ಷಾತ್ಕಾರದ ದಾರಿಯಲ್ಲಿ (Sakshātkarada Daariyalli)
- ಸಸ್ಯ ಪುರಾಣ (Sasyapurāna)
- ಬೃಹದಾರಣ್ಯಕ (Brihadāranyaka) (incomplete)
- ಬೆಳದಿಂಗಳಲ್ಲಿ ಅರಳಿದ ಮೊಲ್ಲೆ (Beladingalalli Aralida Molle) (translation from Kannada by U. V. Swaminatha Iyer)
- ಜ್ಞಾನರಥ (Jnanaratha) (translation from Kannada by Subrahmanya Bharathi)
- ಹರಿದಿಹೆ ಬಾಳೌ ಕಾವೇರಿ (Haridihe Balou Kaveri) (translation from Kannada by Chetti)
- ಮೀನಾಕ್ಷಿಯ ಸೌಗಂಧ (Meenākshiya Saugandha)
- ಶಾಸನಗಳಲ್ಲಿ ಗಿಡಮರಗಳು (Shāsanagalalli Gidamaragalu)
- ಹೂವಿನಿಂದ ಕಾಯಿಗೆ (Hoovininda Kāyige)

== Awards ==
- Karnataka Sahitya Academy Award for Americadalli Naanu
- Sahitya Akademi Award for Hasuru Honnu
- Rajyotsava Prashasti by the Government of Karnataka
- Kannada Sahitya Parishat Award
- Birbal Sahni gold medal by the Government of India for his work in botany.

== See also ==
- D. V. Gundappa
