= Mankuthimmana Kagga =

1943 book by D. V. Gundappa

- Cover of the book
- Author: D. V. Gundappa
- Language: Kannada
- Publisher: Tanu Manu Publications
- Publication date: 1943
- Publication place: India
- Pages: 191 pp

Mankuthimmana Kagga, written by Dr. D. V. Gundappa and published in 1943, is one of the best-known modern literary works in Kannada. It is widely regarded as a masterpiece of Kannada literature and is referred to as the Bhagavad Gita in Kannada. The title of the work can be translated as "Dull Thimma's Rigmarole". Kagga is a collection of 945 poems, each being four lines in length. Some of these poems are written in old Kannada. Kagga poems are profound as well as poetic. Most of them can be sung. Though the author calls it an 'a foggy fools farrago', it is a book giving expression to a noble personality's rich experiences. The poet politely that if the word Mankuthimma is crude and below standard it can be substituted by either Venka or Kanka or Shankararya as they please.

== Popularity ==
Kagga explores deeper questions of life, contemplates on the meaning of the Ultimate Truth (reality) and advises us to lead a balanced life in this complex and ever-changing world. Thus, Kagga advises us to follow the middle path while extending one hand towards the Ultimate Truth and the other hand to the phenomenal world. The message of many of the verses from Kagga is "samatwa".

Kagga is very popular in Kannada literature, and most native Kannada speakers are familiar with at least a few of the poems from this important work. The following are but a few of the poems that are quite well known to people familiar with Kannada literature:

Hullaagu BettadaDi, manege malligeyaagu
Kallaagu kashtagaLa maLe vidhi suriye
Bella sakkareyaagu deena durbalaringe
EllaroLagondaagu Mankuthimma mindarie

Kannada Version:

ಹುಲ್ಲಾಗು ಬೆಟ್ಟದಡಿ, ಮನೆಗೆ ಮಲ್ಲಿಗೆಯಾಗು
ಕಲ್ಲಾಗು ಕಷ್ಟಗಳ ಮಳೆಯ ವಿಧಿ ಸುರಿಯೆ
ಬೆಲ್ಲ ಸಕ್ಕರೆಯಾಗು ದೀನ ದುರ್ಬಲರಿಂಗೆ
ಎಲ್ಲರೊಳಗೊಂದಾಗು ಮಂಕುತಿಮ್ಮ

Meaning:

be a (gentle) blade of grass at the foot of mountain, and jasmine flower at home,
Be (strong) like a rock when fate pours (torrential) rains of difficulties on you,
Be sweet like sugar and jaggery to the poor and weak,
Be one among all, Mankuthimma.

== The Spirit of Kagga ==
One of the popular poems from this work, "Hullagu bettadadi", translated below, conveys the spirit of Kagga.

be a (gentle) blade of grass at the foot of the mountain; and jasmine flower at home
Be (strong) like a rock when fate pours (torrential) rains of difficulties on you
Be sweet like sugar and jaggery to the poor and weak
Be one with all, Mankuthimma.

This short and beautiful poem holds the key for leading a balanced life. It advises us to be humble and gentle yet strong. The song says, be humble like a blade of grass at the foot of the mountain and spread your fragrance like a gentle jasmine flower. The metaphor of gentle blade of grass at the foot of the mountain is very profound. When the rain pours over the mountains, when the mighty winds blow, the tall trees on the mountains may fall down, but the gentle blade of grass will bend and survive. The tall trees are "too proud" to bend and surrender to the winds, whereas the humble blade of grass will bend and surrender to the mighty wind. Thus this song imparts to us one of the secrets of life, which lies in learning how to survive by understanding the humbleness of the gentle blade of grass. This poem says, do not always stand firm like a proud, tall tree, but bend like a gentle blade of grass when the winds blow. But, when fate brings its share of difficulties, be ready to face them like a rock. Become a solid rock and face all the difficulties in life. Be gentle and send your fragrance in all directions like the jasmine flower, but also learn to face the difficulties like a rock. Be strong, yet be compassionate to the poor, weak and down-trodden. Do all you can to help the poor and the needy. In the last line, this poem tells us to lead a harmonious life by becoming one with all people.

Alternatively, (Hullagu Bettadali) It also means live a life similar to that of grass on the foot of hill, which serves as food for grazing cattle. Lead a life that is useful to others and self. (manege mallige) Lead a life that is liked by all similar to jasmine flower whose fragrance is liked by all. (Kallagu Kashtagala male vidhi suriye) Psychologically be bold, strong and firm like stone when obstacles in life are encountered. (Bella, sakkare deena durbalarige) Be kind, generous, tolerant and considerate towards weaker and needy people. (Ellarolu ondagu) Finally, just become one with all, lead a flexible life with others.

In these four short lines, this poem teaches us the secret of leading a balanced and harmonious life, emphasizing gentleness, humbleness, compassion on the one hand and strength on the other hand. The poem explains in simple poetic images one of the messages of the Bhagavad Gita: samatwam, or balance in life (SAMATWAM YOGA UCCHATE).

There is also Marula Muniyana Kagga which is considered as the practical extension of Mankuthimmana Kagga

== Significance ==
Manku Thimmana Kagga explores the complexity of life, the various aspects of life - in a simple set of striking words.

An instance (roughly translated to English):

Life is a Horse driven cart, Fate its driver
You are the horse, Passengers - as allotted by him (interpreted as god)
Sometimes rides to a wedding, sometimes to the graveyard
On stumbling, there is always the earth, O, Manku Thimma

Kannada version:

ಬದುಕು ಜಟಕಾಬಂಡಿ, ವಿಧಿ ಅದರ ಸಾಹೇಬ,
ಕುದುರೆ ನೀನ್,ಅವನು ಪೇಳ್ದಂತೆ ಪಯಣಿಗರು.
ಮದುವೆಗೋ ಮಸಣಕೋ ಹೋಗೆಂದಕಡೆಗೋಡು,
ಪದಕುಸಿಯೆ ನೆಲವಿಹುದು ಮಂಕುತಿಮ್ಮ

Baduku jatakaa bandi, Vidhi adara saaheba.
Kudure neen, Avanu peldante payanigaru.
Maduvego masanako, Hogendakadegodu.
Padakusiye nelavihudu Mankutimma

Another excerpt (Translation) :

Be like the tiny grass that grows
In the crevices at a giant mountain's foot,
Be like the fragrant jasmine flower
Which fills the air with perfume sweet,
Stand like a rock if destiny cruel
Showers you with hardships, big and small,
Be sweet as rock candy to people in distress,
Oh naive one, just be one among all.

Kannada version:

ಹುಲ್ಲಾಗು ಬೆಟ್ಟದಡಿ, ಮನೆಗೆ ಮಲ್ಲಿಗೆಯಾಗು,
ಕಲ್ಲಾಗು ಕಷ್ಟಗಳ ಮಳೆಯ ವಿಧಿ ಸುರಿಯೆ.
ಬೆಲ್ಲ-ಸಕ್ಕರೆಯಾಗು ದೀನದುರ್ಬಲರಿಂಗೆ.
ಎಲ್ಲರೊಳಗೊಂದಾಗು ಮಂಕುತಿಮ್ಮ.

Hullagu bettadadi, manege malligeyaagu,
kallagu, kashtagala maleya vidhi suriye,
Bella-sakkareyaagu deenadurbalaringe,
Ellarolagondagu Mankutimma

Gauravisu jeevanava Gauravisu chetanava
Aaradoo jagavendu bedavenisadiru
Horuvude jeevan samruddigosuga ninage
Daari aatmounnatige – Mankuthimma

Value the life, Respect the soul.
This universe is yours and everyone’s
Universe is not meant only for your uplift
But the journey strengthens your soul.

This is another gem on how to lead life.

ಜಗದೀ ಜಗತ್ತ್ವವನು, ಮಯಾವಿಚಿತ್ರವನು।
ಒಗೆದಾಚೆ ಬಿಸುಡೆಲ್ಲ ಕರಣವೇದ್ಯವನು ॥
ಮಿಗುವುದೇಂ ? ರೂಪಾಖ್ಯೆಯೊಂದುಮಿಲ್ಲದ ವಸ್ತು।
ಹೊಗಿಸಾ ಕಡೆಗೆ ಮತಿಯ -- ಮಂಕುತಿಮ್ಮ

Discard the essence of the world from the world; discard all material objects;
abandon all happenings around you - all things listened to, or seen, or felt by touch (senses).
What then remains is a formless substance.
Turn your mind towards that formlessness - Mankutimma

== See also ==
- 1943 in poetry
- Marula Muniyana Kagga
- D. V. Gundappa
