= Nadahalli, Shimoga district =

Nadahalli nadalli
- Village
- Location in Karnataka, India Nadahalli (India)
- Coordinates: 14°21′46″N 75°4′42″E
- Country: India
- State: Karnataka

Government
  - Type: Panchayati raj (India)
  - Body: Gram panchayat

Languages
  - Official: Kannada
- Time zone: UTC+5:30 (IST)
- ISO 3166 code: IN-KA
- Vehicle registration: KA
- Website: karnataka.gov.in

Nadahalli is a village in Soraba taluk, Shimoga District in the state of Karnataka, India. It is around 2 km away from Soraba Town.

Many people of many castes like havyak harijan etc. live together with harmony and brotherhood. This village is richest of intelligent personalities, scholar like N. Ranganatha Sharma and many doctors, surgeons etc.
