= H. V. Nanjundaiah =

Indian judge (1860–1920)

H. V. Nanjundaiah CIE
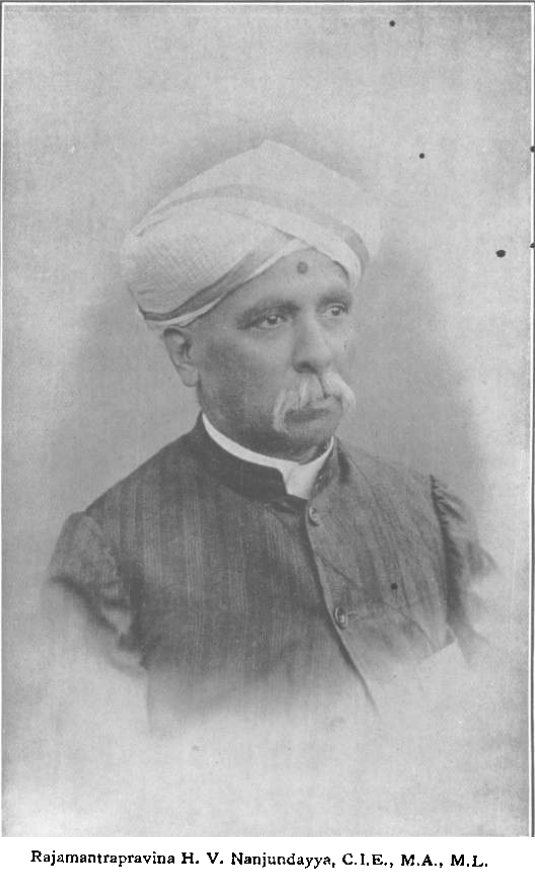

Diwan of Mysore (acting)

Personal details
- Born: 1860
- Died: 1920 (aged 59–60)
- Education: University of Madras

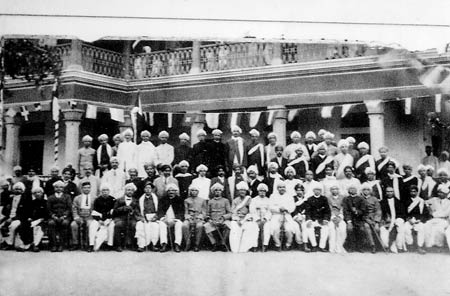
H. V. Nanjundaiah in the conference held in Bangalore in 1915 which led to the creation of Kannada Saahithya Parishath

Hebbalalu Velpanur Nanjundaiah CIE (1860 – 1920) was the acting Diwan of Mysore, founder and first Vice Chancellor of the University of Mysore, senior judge of the Mysore State High Court and founding president of the Kannada Sahitya Sammelana. He presided over Kannada Sahitya Sammelana from 1915 to 1917 held in Bangalore and Mysore. He was one of the first documented ethnographers in the world, having authored a seminal book Mysore tribes and Castes in 1906, among other books on legal matters.

He earned an M.A. and a M.L. (law degree) from the Madras University. He died in 1920 at Mysore while still in office as vice-chancellor. He was a senior judge in the then Mysore State High Court before being the principal administrator and then acting Diwan of Mysore. He was one of the first residents of Malleshwaram, a locality in Bangalore, and his mansion was donated to the government to set up a girls' high school that still stands on 13th Cross, 4th Main Malleshwaram, Bangalore. His family still lives near the same Mansion turned School

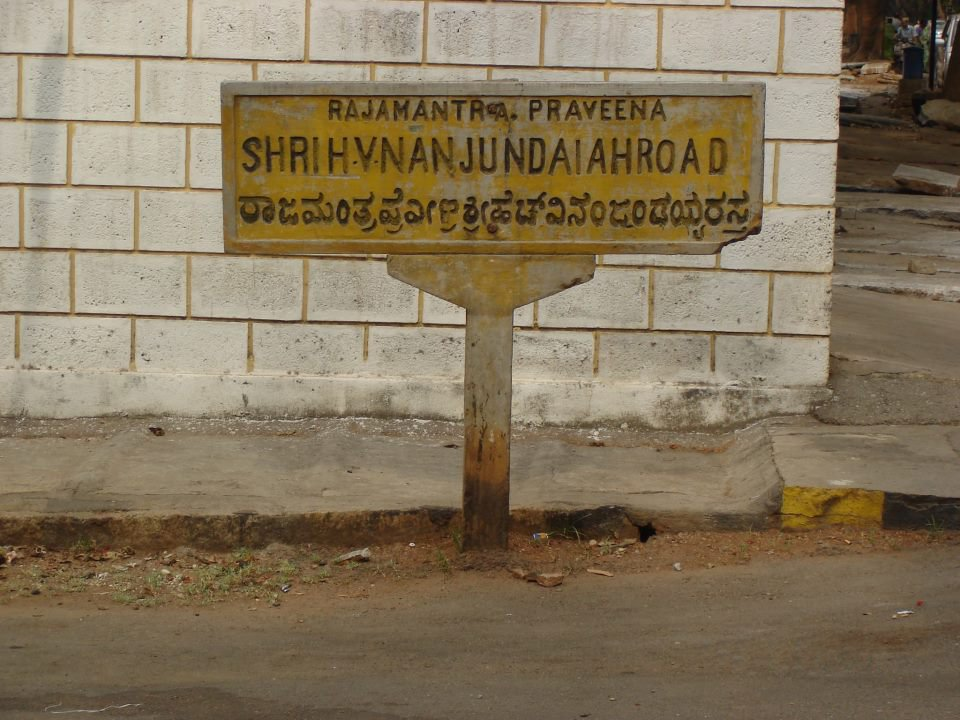
Road sign at 6th main road, Malleshwaram, named after Nanjundaiah

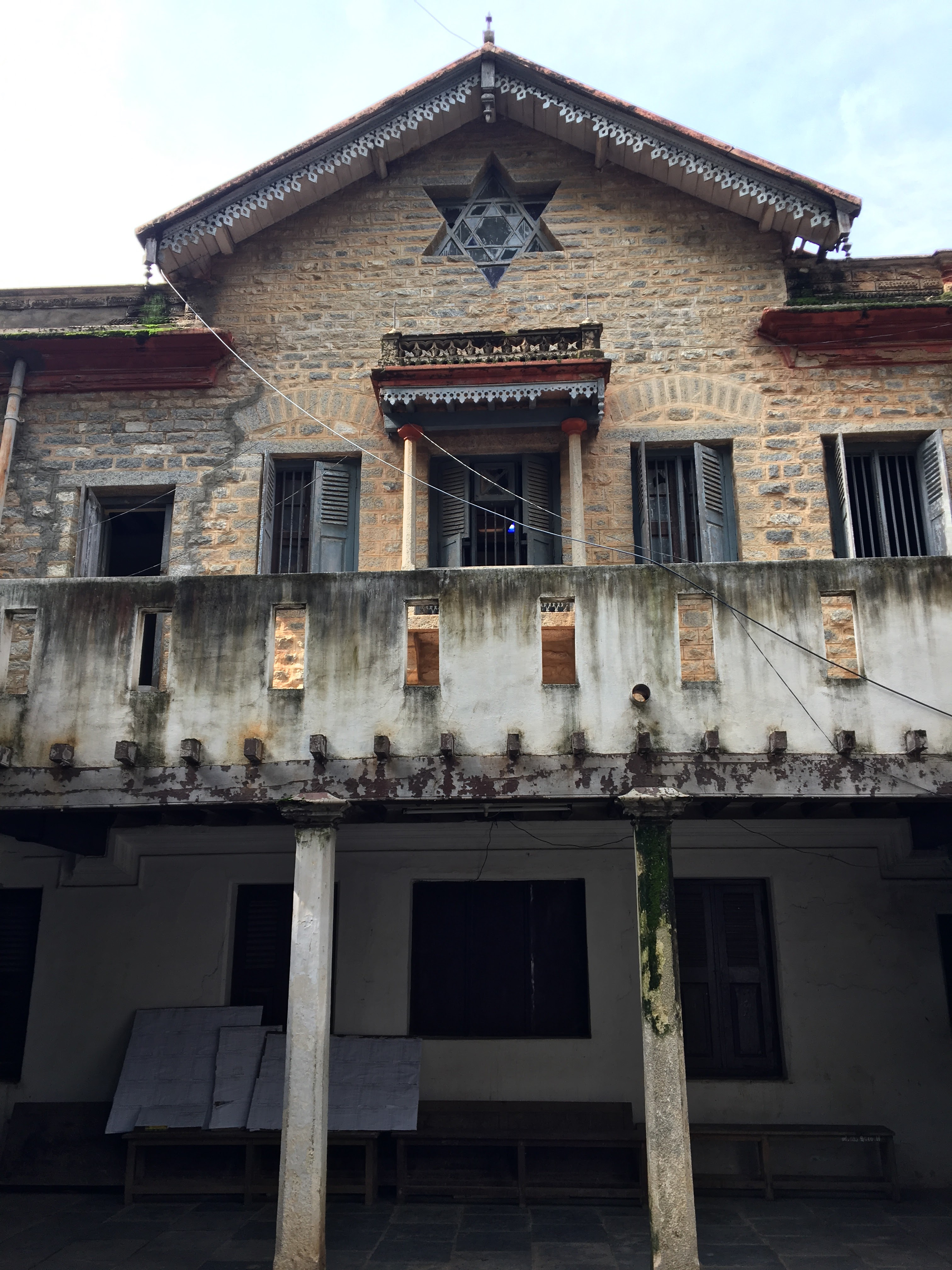
H. V. Nanjundaiah donated his home to the government to create an educational institute for girls, which is what surrounds this building today.

He was also involved in the Indian Science Congress Association and served as the Vice president for Ethnography in 1915.

Under his administrative recommendation Sarvepalli Radhakrishnan, who eventually became the second president of India, was brought to Mysore University from Madras Presidency College and they became close associates.

Personal Life: He rose to high position despite challenges in his personal life. He came from a poor family and obtained qualifications in Madras. He lost two wives at a young age and lost a son. In the memory of the deceased son, he translated a collection of poems of Victor Hugo entitled "Tears in the dark".

== Honours ==
He was conferred the title of Rajamantra Praveena or Privy councillor by the Maharaja of Mysore, as he was the Maharaja's closest political and administrative advisor. During difficult administrative periods, he would function as the Acting Diwan of Mysore also.

Nanjundaiah was made a Companion of the Order of the Indian Empire in 1915, an honor of chivalry bestowed upon him by HRH King George V.

== Linguistics ==
Nanjundaiah's had great love for his Kannada language. He founded the Kannada Sahitya Parishat to promote Kannada through publishing books, organizing literary seminars, promoting research projects and organize an annual conference on Kannada literature called Kannada Sahithya Sammelana.

The body unanimously selected Nanjundaiah to chair the event and serve as president for three years. At the first gathering, he is reported to have spoken in English and said: "The objective of the Karnataka Sahitya Parishath is to develop Kannada language and literature and forge unity of all Kannadigas who are scattered; to establish a cordial relationship among them on the issue of language".

He was a polyglot and published an English translation and compilation of Victor Hugo's French poems called 'Tears in the Night'.
