= Kannada Sahitya Parishat =

Indian Kannada literary organization

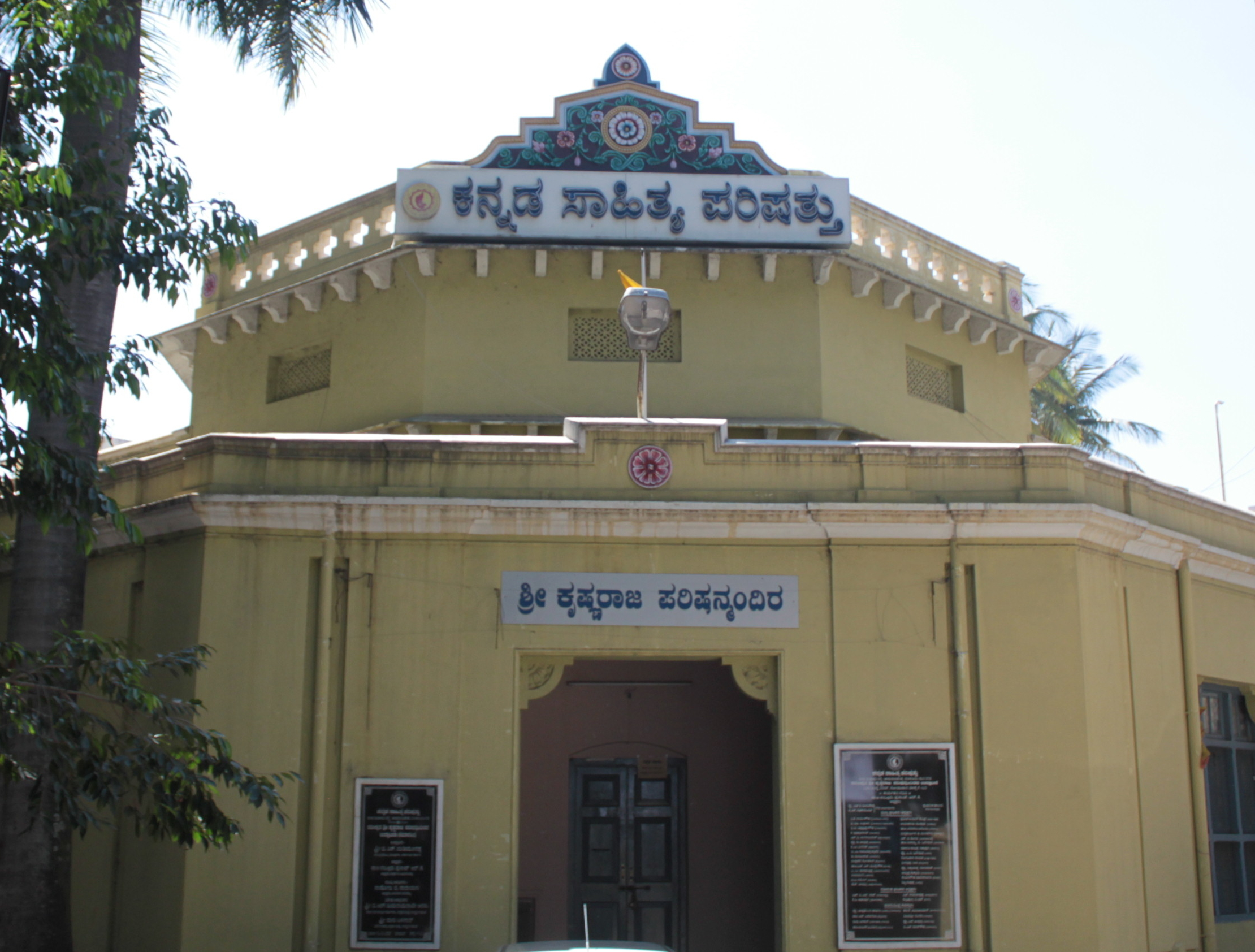
Sahitya Parishat Building

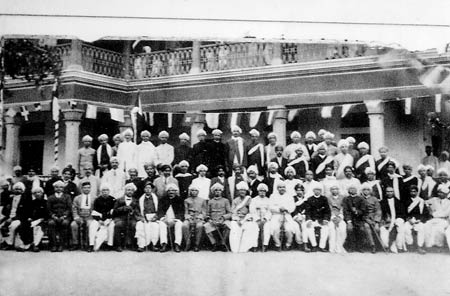
The members of the conference held in Bangalore in 1915 which led to the creation of Kannada Saahithya Parishath

Kannada Saahithya Parishat (Kannada: ಕನ್ನಡ ಸಾಹಿತ್ಯ ಪರಿಷತ್ತು, romanized: Kannaḍa Sāhitya Pariṣattu; lit. 'Kannada Literary Council') is an Indian non-profit organisation that promotes the Kannada language and its literature. Its headquarters are in the city of Bengaluru in the state of Karnataka, India. It strives to promote Kannada language through publishing books, organising literary seminars and promoting research projects. It also organises an annual conference on Kannada literature called Kannada Sahithya Sammelana (Kannada Literary Meet). The current president of the parishat is K. A. Dayananda.

== Origin ==
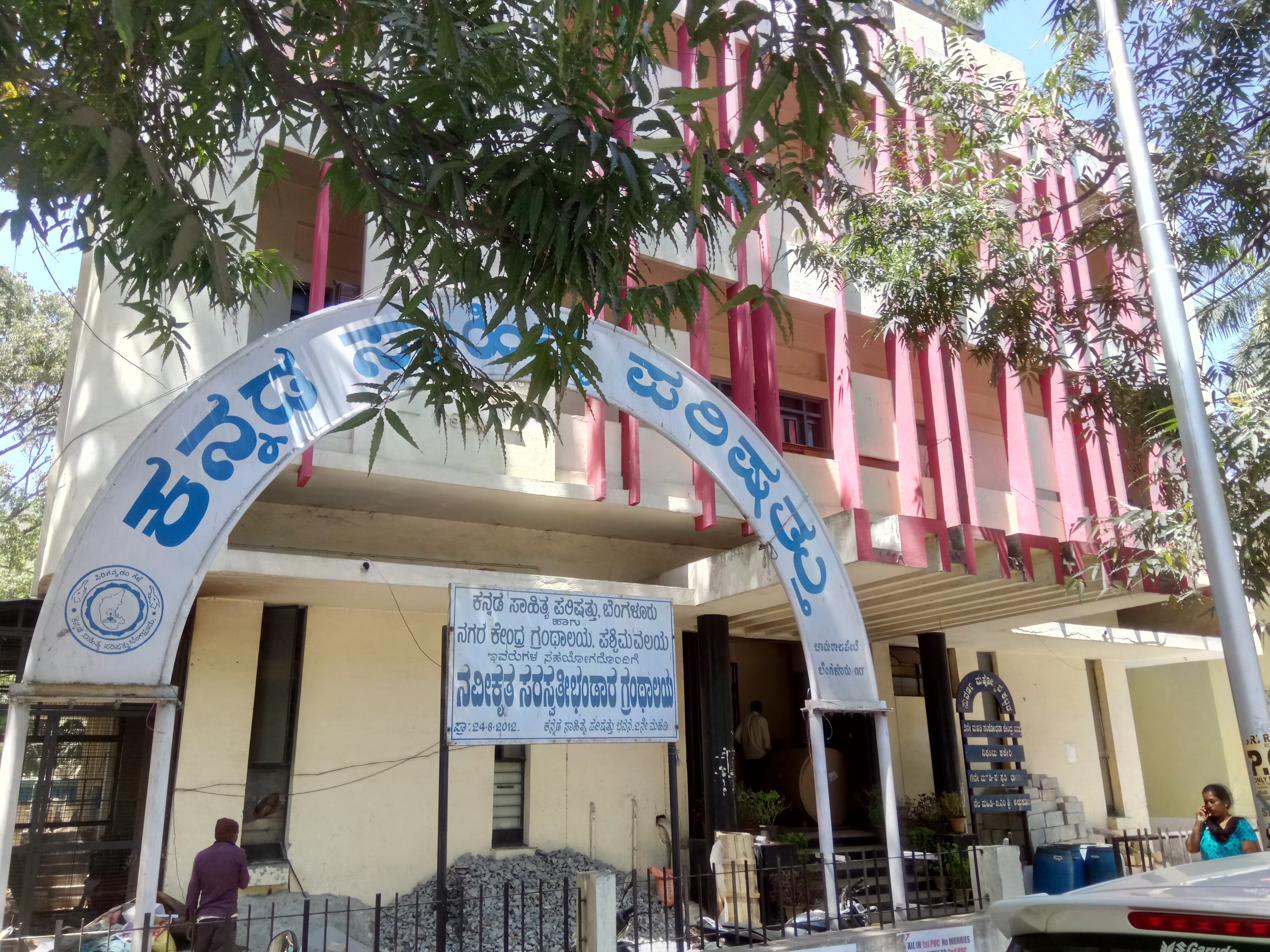
Kannada Sahitya Parishat's building (with a modernized library) at Pampa Mahakavi Road, Chamrajpet, Bengaluru.

During the British rule of India, Kannada speakers were spread across different provinces. Coming under the influence of different languages in those provinces, the pronunciation and grammar of Kannada language started to differ across provinces. This led to a gap in communication across the people in these provinces though they spoke the same language of Kannada. Mokshagundam Vishweshwaraiah, who was the Diwan of the Mysore Kingdom felt the need to conserve and promote the Kannada language and literature. In this direction, he started the Mysore Economic Conference and created a study circle under H. V. Nanjundaiah under the aegis of Maharaja Krishna Raja Wadiyar IV.

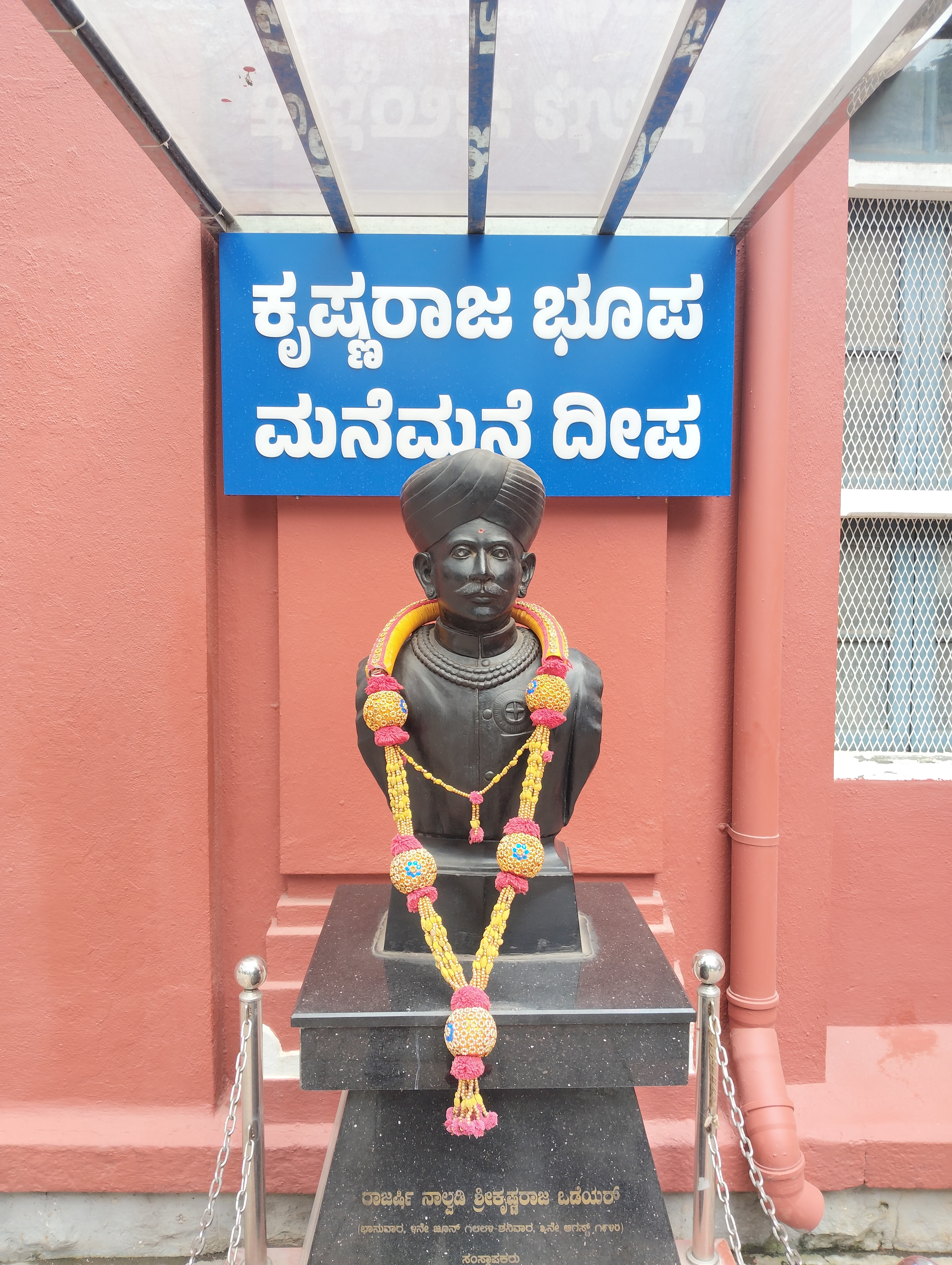
Krishna Raja wodeyar bust at Kannada saahitya parishath premises

A sub-committee formed under the study circle came up with five different topics on which suggestions were invited:

- To develop ideas to promote unity and co-operation among Kannada speakers spread across different regions.
- To develop suggestions for a common written Kannada which had diversified across different regions
- To ensure that students learning Kannada language use a common textbook
- To improve the general knowledge among the Kannada speaking population by publishing appropriate books.
- To produce appropriate Kannada translations for words used in other languages, especially the scientific words.

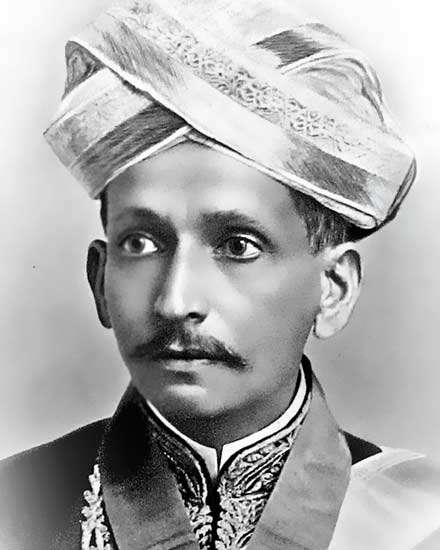
Bharat Ratna Sir M. Vishveshvarayya in his thirties. He was the Dewan of Mysore and initiated the Parishat's founding

The sub-committee received good responses from the public and it decided to organise a conference in Bangalore on 3 May 1915 to act upon these suggestions. The conference was held on the grounds of the Government High School and was attended by littérateurs, newspaper editors and other dignitaries from different regions. The conference agreed to create the Karnataka Sahitya Parishat with a mandate to conserve and promote Kannada language and literature. H. V. Nanjundaiah was unanimously elected as the President of the Parishat. The other founding members were Karpur Srinivasa Rao, P.S. Achyuta Rao and R. Raghunath Rao. Karpur Srinivasa Rao personally framed the organisation's constitution and byelaws. Apart from the Mysore province, the Kannada Sahitya Parishat was simultaneously started in the Madras, Mumbai, Hyderabad and Kodagu provinces.

== Growth ==
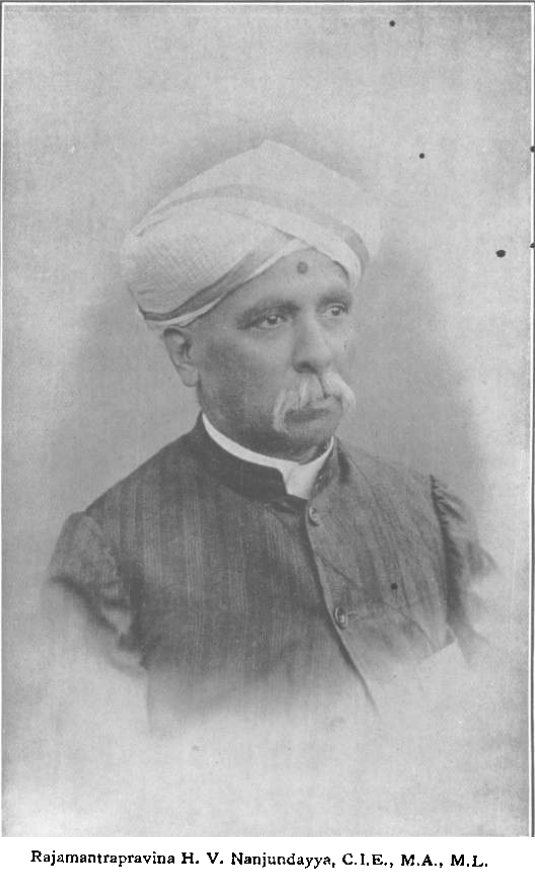
H. V. Nanjundaiah, founding President (1915–1920).

H. V. Nanjundaiah remained as President of the Parishat for the first five years of its creation. Karpur Srinivasa Rao served as Vice-President of the Parishat from 1918 until his death on 2 June 1932 — a period of fourteen years. As the Presidency was traditionally held honorarily by members of the Mysore royal family, the Vice-President was the effective working head of the organisation. D.V. Gundappa described his contribution as "herculean", writing that he raised funds and enlisted members from across the state, knew every Kannada scholar, and never missed a single conference.

On 12 April 1931, Vice-President Karpur Srinivasa Rao personally laid the foundation stone of the Parishat's permanent building, despite being afflicted by paralysis in his final years. Unable to act himself, a long thread was tied between his finger and the trowel, with his colleague S. Venkatanarayanappa guiding the trowel from outside the car in which Karpur Srinivasa Rao was seated. Funds for the building were donated by Maharaja Krishnaraja Wadiyar IV (Rs. 5,000), the Yuvaraj (Rs. 3,000), RajaBandhu M. Kanataraj Urs (Rs. 5,000), and a government grant of Rs. 15,289 arranged by Sir Mirza Ismail. The construction of this building was completed on 29 May 1938.

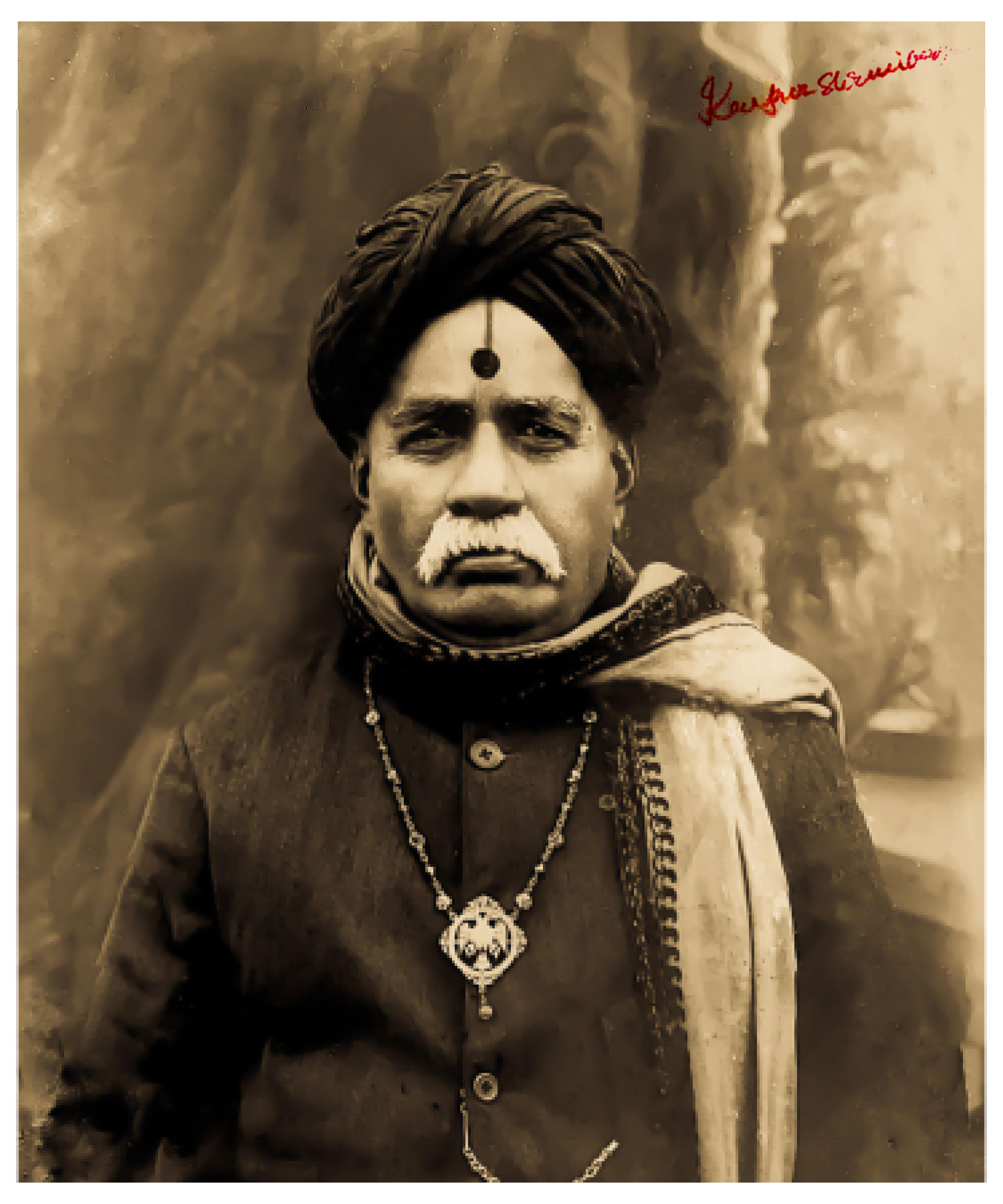
Karpur Srinivasa Rao, Co-founder and Vice-President (1918–1932).

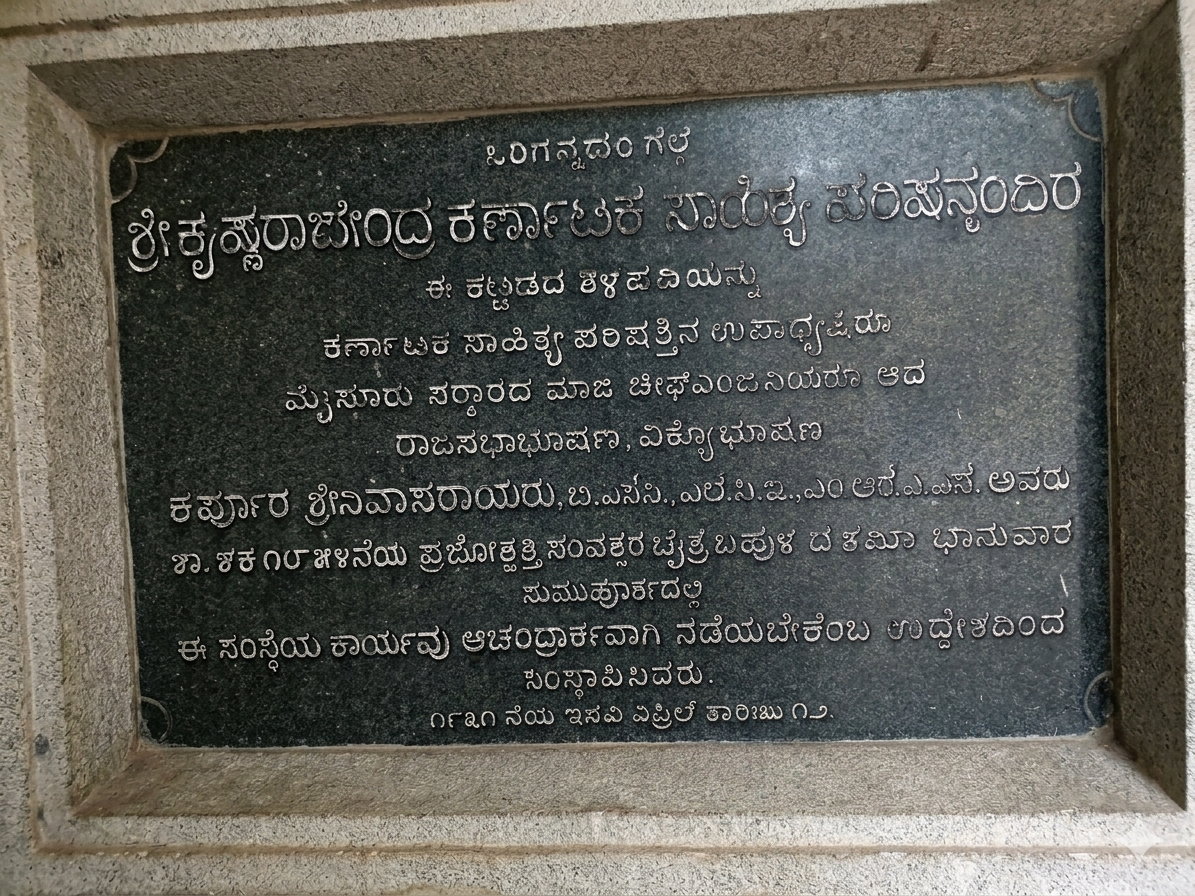
Foundation stone plaque at the Kannada Sahitya Parishat building, Pampa Mahakavi Road, Chamarajapet, Bangalore. The inscription records that the foundation stone was laid by the Vice-President of the Karnataka Sahitya Parishat and Former Chief Engineer of the Mysore Government, Rajasabhabhushana, Vidyabhushana, Karpur Srinivasarayaru, B.Sc., L.C.E., M.R.A.S. on 12 April 1931 (Shaka 1853). This plaque provides physical confirmation of his post-nominal M.R.A.S. (Member of the Royal Asiatic Society).

In 1935, an annual event under the aegis of the Parishat called as Kannada Sahitya Sammelana commenced. B M Srikantaiah was the Vice President of the Parishat from 1938 till 1942. In 1938, the name of Karnataka Sahitya Parishat was changed to Kannada Sahitya Parishat. Under the guidance of B M Srikantaiah, the logo of the Parishat containing the map of the Mysore province with the phrase Sirigannadam gelge, Kannada Sahitya Parishat written inside it was created. Over the period of time; a women's wing, a publishing house, a Kannada journal and literature exams were also added to the repertoire of the Parishat. Kannada Sahitya Parishat branches at the district and taluk levels were also created. A new building is being constructed to replace the existing building of the Parishat at a cost of Rupees five crores. During its existence, the Parishat has contributed to the growth of Kannada language by organising conferences and debates, publication and release of books, organising talks by eminent writers and also by holding the annual Kannada Sahitya Sammelana.

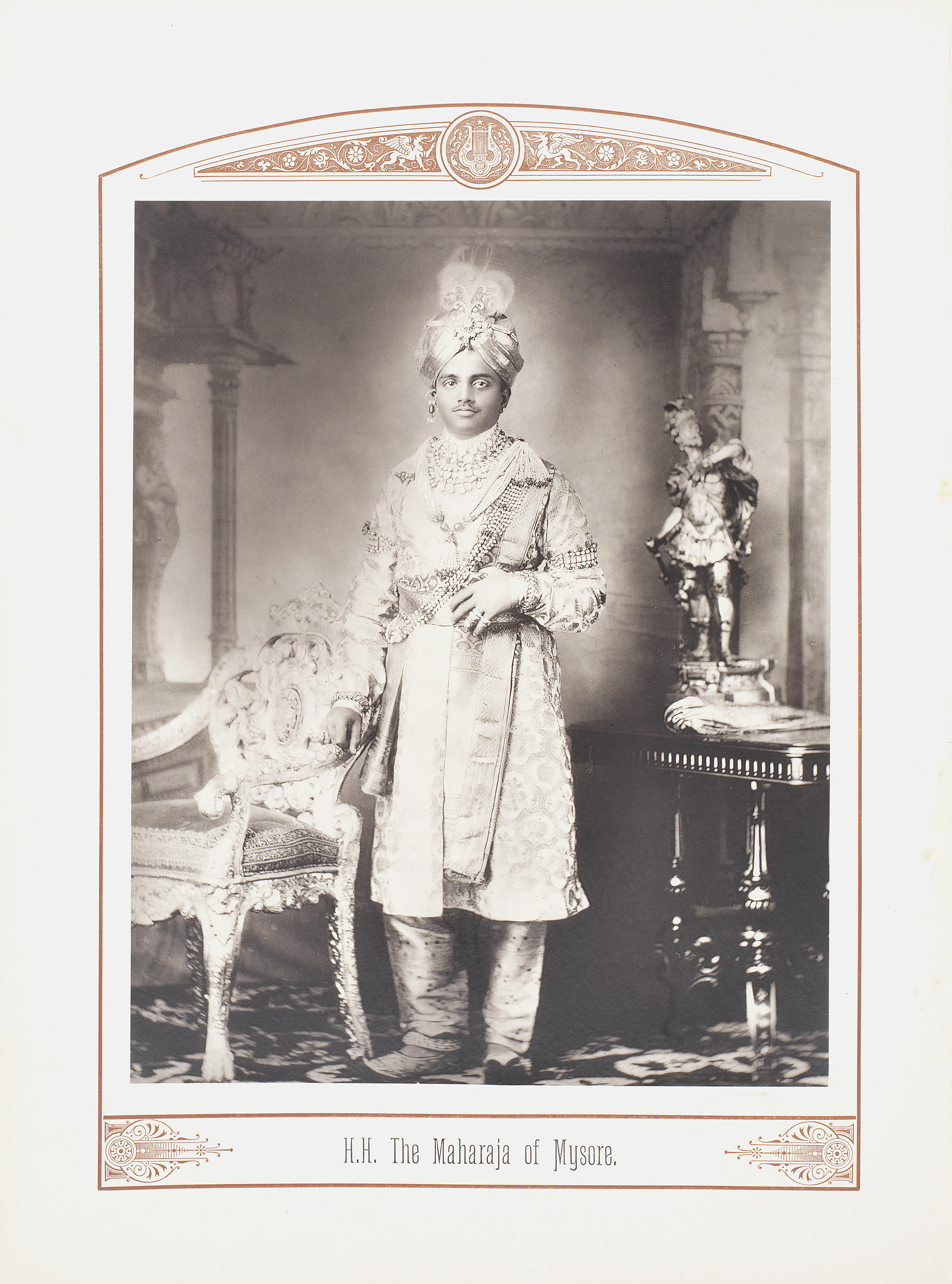
Maharaja Nalvadi Krishnaraja Wadiyar, royal patron of the Parishat.

== List of presidents of the Sahitya Parishat ==
From 1915 to 1940, the presidents of the Kannada Sahitya Parishat (KSP) were chosen by unanimous consensus. Subsequently, an electoral system was implemented.

- Sri H. V. Nanjundaiah – 1915–1920
- Sir M. Kantaraj Urs – 1920–1923
- Sri Kanteerava Narasimharaja Wadiyar – 1924–1940
- Sri Jayachamaraja Wadiyar – 1940–1940
- Sri Basavaprabhu Raja Lakhamagouda Sirdesai Bahadur – 1941–1946
- Sri Lokur Narayanrao Swamirao – 08-06-1947 to 29-12-1947
- Sri Tirumale Tatacharya Sharma – 29-12-1947 to 06-03-1949
- Sri Reverend Uttangi Chennappa – 06-03-1949 to 17-12-1950
- Sri M. R. Srinivasamurthy – 17-12-1950 to 16-09-1953
- Dr. Masti Venkatesha Iyengar – 30-09-1953 to 09-05-1954
- Prof. A. N. Moorthy Rao – 09-05-1954 to 17-05-1956
- Sri B. Shivamurthy Shastry – 17-05-1956 to 25-10-1964
- Prof. G. Venkatasubbaiah – 25-10-1964 to 11-06-1969
- Sri G. Narayana – 11-06-1969 to 23-07-1978
- Dr. Hampa Nagarajaiah – 23-07-1978 to 19-02-1986
- H. B. Jwalanaiah – 19-02-1986 to 01-11-1988
- Prof. G. S. Siddalingaiah – 22-02-1989 to 14-05-1992
- Sri Go. Ru. Channabasappa – 14-05-1992 to 22-06-1995
- Dr. Sa. Shi. Marulayya – 22-06-1995 to 10-07-1998
- Sri N. Basavaradhya – 10-07-1998 to 11-07-2001
- Sri Harikrishna Punarooru – 11-07-2001 to 02-11-2004
- Prof. Chandrashekhara Patila (Champa) – 02-11-2004 to 30-04-2008
- Dr. Nallur Prasad R. K. – 27-08-2008 to 27-02-2012
- Pundalika Halambi – 03-05-2012 to 2015
- Dr. Manu Baligar – 03-03-2016 to 2021
- Dr. Mahesh Joshi – 22-11-2021 to 21-11-2025
- Sri K. A. Dayananda, IAS – 22-11-2025 onwards

== List of vice presidents of the Sahitya Parishat ==
- M. Shama Rao 1915 to 1918
- Karpur Srinivasa Rao - 1918 to 1932
- D. V. Gundappa
- B. M. Srikantaiah

== Criticism ==
The Parishat has reportedly lost focus on its goals due to various reasons including lack of funds and political interference. There were also reports of irregularities conducted within the Parishat in 1987, which prompted the Karnataka Government to nominate an administrator to the Parishat. The office of the administrator was removed in 1989.

== Gallery ==
Founding figures of the Kannada Sahitya Parishat

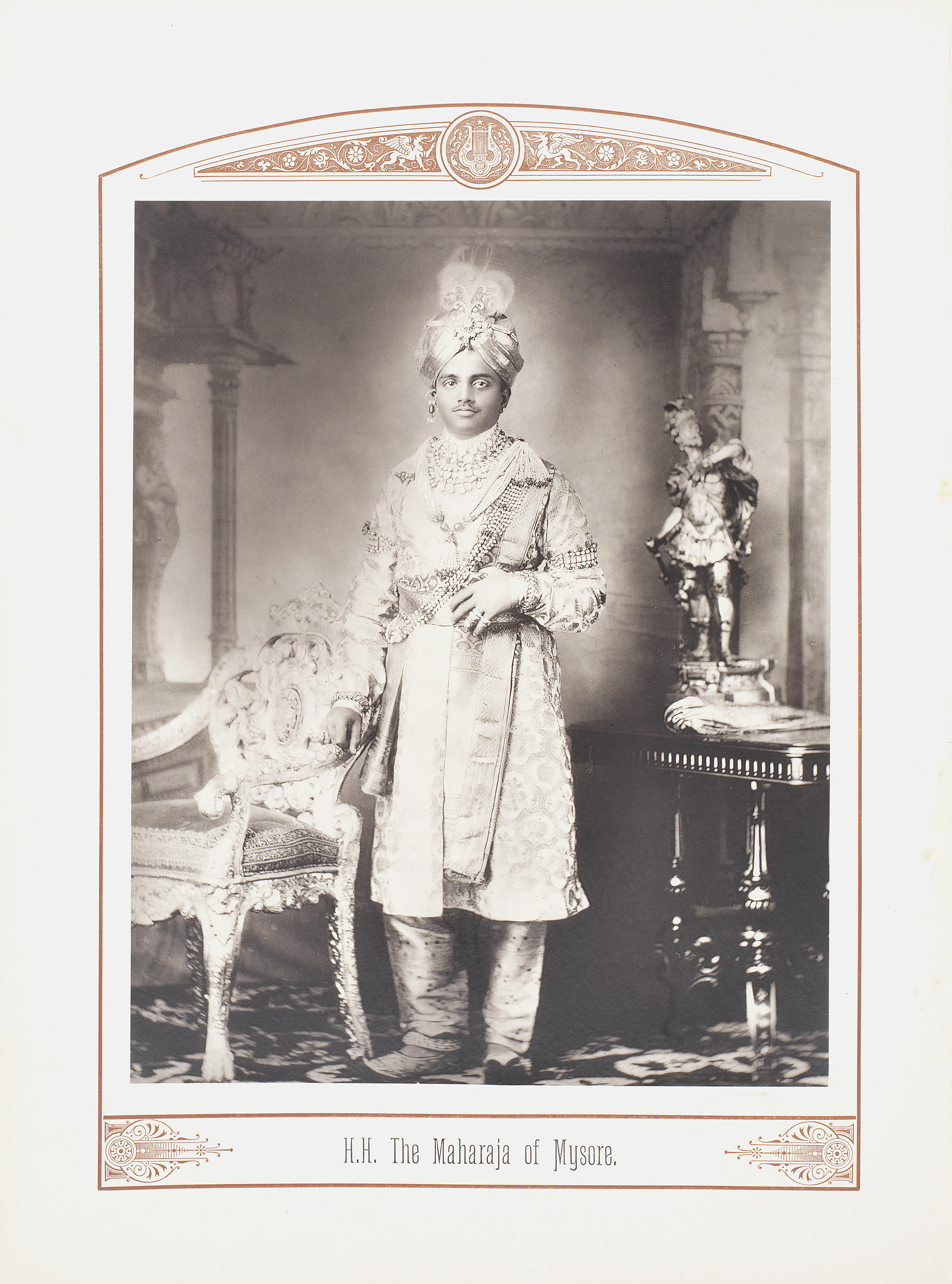
Maharaja Nalvadi Krishnaraja Wadiyar, royal patron of the Parishat

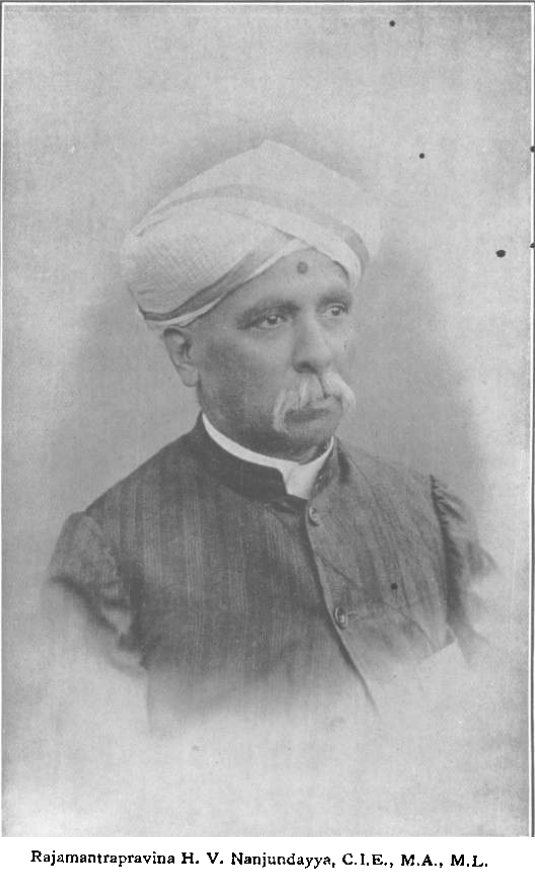
H. V. Nanjundaiah, founding President (1915–1920)

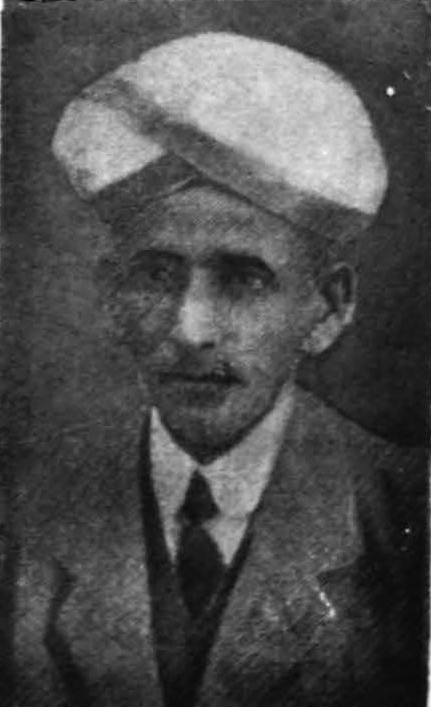
M. Visvesvaraya, Dewan of Mysore, who initiated the Parishat's founding

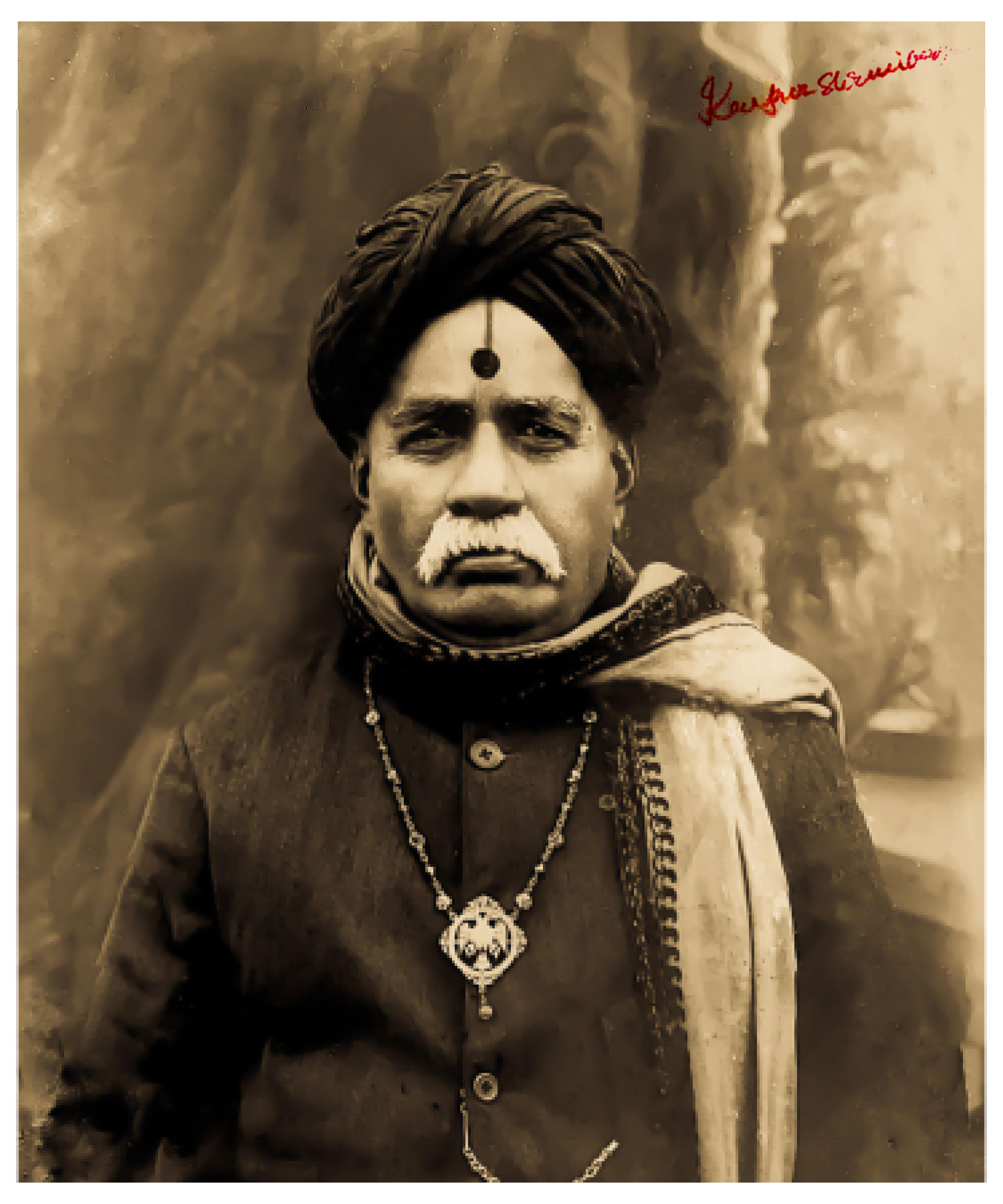
Karpur Srinivasa Rao, co-founder and Vice-President (1918–1932)

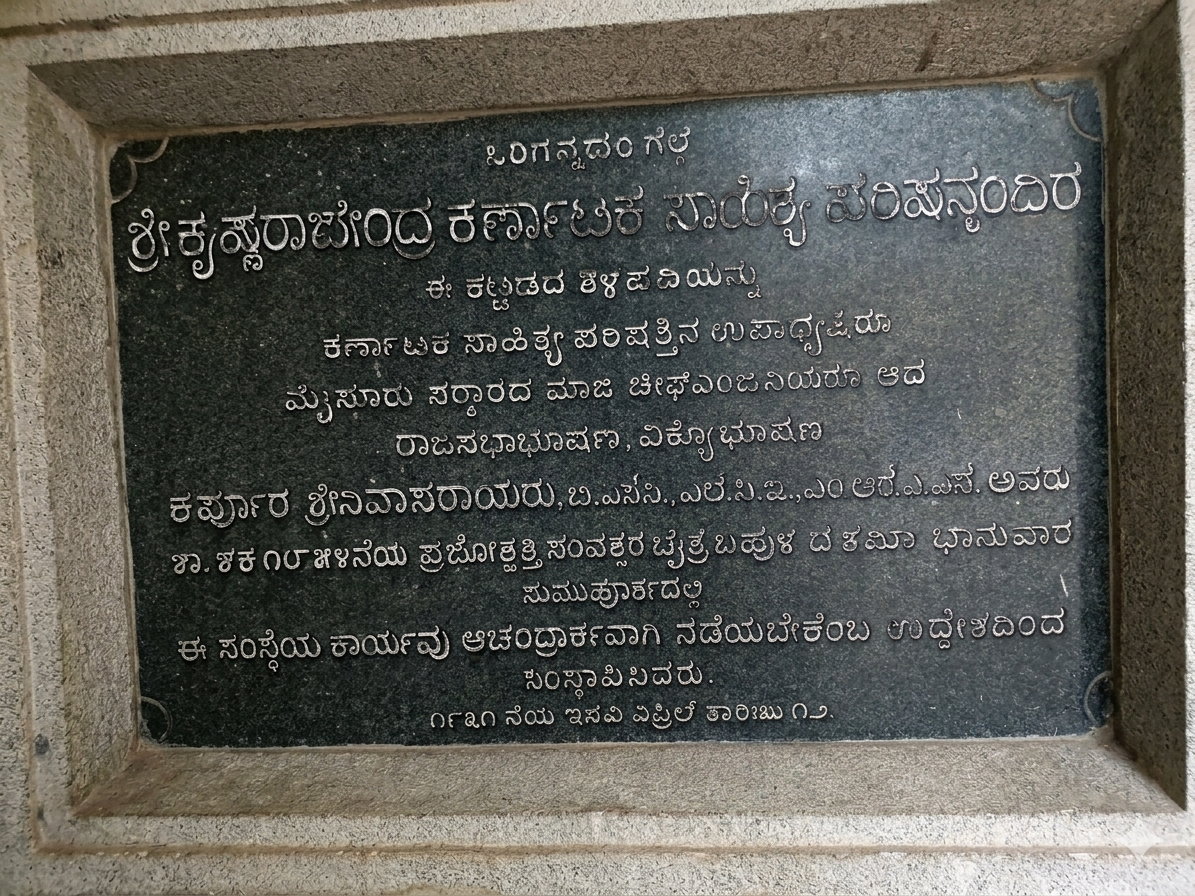
Foundation stone plaque at the Kannada Sahitya Parishat building, 12 April 1931. The inscription records KSR's post-nominals as B.Sc., L.C.E., M.R.A.S. and his titles Rajasabhabhushana and Vidyabhushana. Photo: Prasanna Karpur.

== See also ==
- Kannada Sahitya Sammelana
