= Marula Muniyana Kagga =

Poems by Devanahalli Venkataramanaiah Gundappa

- Cover of the book
- Author: D. V. Gundappa
- Language: Kannada
- Publisher: Kavyalaya, Mysore
- Publication date: 1984
- Publication place: India
- Pages: 217

Marula Muniyana Kagga is practically the extension of Mankuthimmana Kagga. These are the stray poems of Devanahalli Venkataramanaiah Gundappa, referred to as DVG, which have been collected together and published after his death. We can find in these poems the expression of fine thoughts of a person who had immense interest in the affairs of divinity. Written by an amateur person each poem contains ripened wisdom of a great scholar. Though the poet claims that Marula Muniya is the brother of Mankuthimma, one could realize before long that Muniya is none other than Mankuthimma himself. It is no wonder if DVG himself must have felt the development of this kind of writing.

Like the growing tail of
Hanuman in Lanka,
Questions and problems keep
Surging forth for this talkative,
a stammerer, Marula Muniya

No Comic story is this Kagga, nor
It is an emotional outpouring,
Stuff it is for cogitation in mind,
Enjoy each poem, one at a time, Marula Muniya

There are 825 poems in this book, 120 poems less than the number of poems in Kagga.

== See also ==
- Mankuthimmana Kagga
- D. V. Gundappa
