= Gokhale Institute of Public Affairs =

Public Institute

The Gokhale Institute of Public Affairs (GIPA) was founded by D. V. Gundappa on 15 August 1948. He was inspired by Gopal Krishna Gokhale's idea of public spirituality and established this institute to further public spiritual health. It is in Basavanagudi, Bangalore, Karnataka, India.

Today it is famous for arranging talks on various aspects of public life and spirituality by noted philosophers such as Belagere Krishna Shastry, Shatavadhani R.Ganesh, Bannanje Govindacharya, Narayanacharya, Gururaj Karajagi, Ganesh Bhat Hobli, Jayatheerthacharya Malagi, Natesh and others. The institute also provides a large library for those interested in referential studies. It also offers the different talks done in its premises as CDs for sale. It is also associated with people such as Nittoor Srinivasa Rau.
