= D. V. Gundappa =

Indian writer

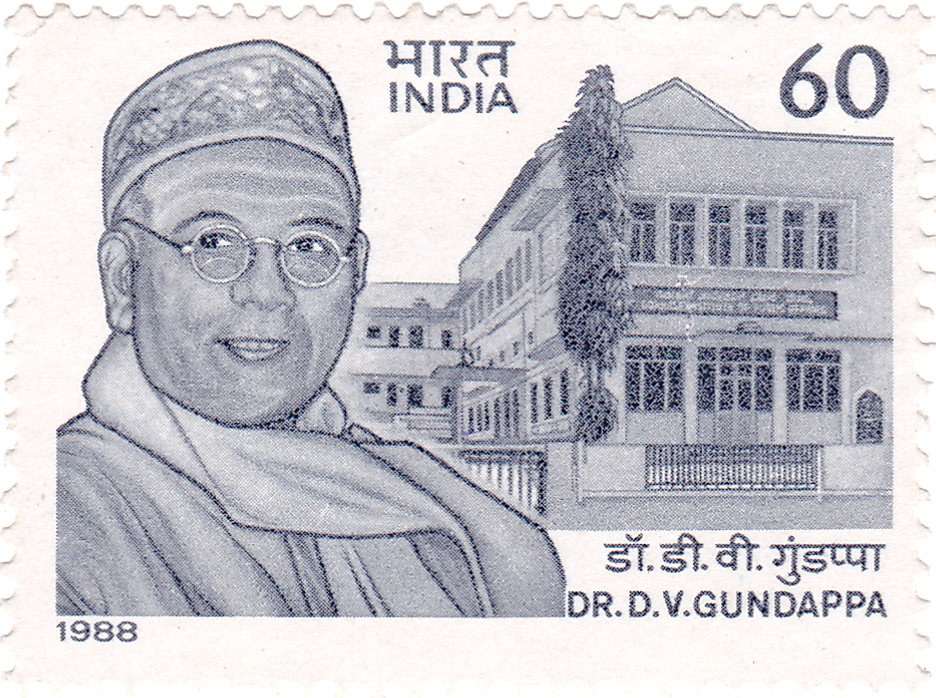
- Gundappa on a 1988 stamp of India
- Born: Devanahalli Venkataramanaiah Gundappa; 17 March 1887; Mulbagal, Kolar, Kingdom of Mysore
- Died: 7 October 1975 (aged 88)
- Other name: DVG
- Occupations: Philosopher; writer; poet; journalist
- Known for: Manku Thimmana Kagga, Marula Muniyana Kagga
- Family: Bhageerathamma (spouse), B. G. L. Swamy (son)

Devanahalli Venkataramanaiah Gundappa (17 March 1887 – 7 October 1975), popularly known as DVG, was an Indian writer, poet and philosopher in Kannada-language. He is one of the stalwarts of modern Kannada literature. His most notable work is the Mankuthimmana Kagga ("Dull Thimma's Rigmarole", 1943), which is similar to the wisdom poems of the late medieval poet Sarvajna.

== Legacy ==
Published in 1943, Mankuthimmana Kagga is a well-known literary work in Kannada. Its title translates to "Dull Thimma's Rigmarole." The text consists of philosophical verses that address themes such as resilience, detachment, human aspirations, social responsibility, and ego dissolution. It employs similes, metaphors, and varied linguistic expressions. The work has been translated into English (twice), Hindi, and Sanskrit. Author D.V. Gundappa (DVG) is regarded by critics such as Ranganatha Sharma as a significant figure in Kannada literature and is noted for his engagement with social issues

D. V. G wrote a sequel to Mankuthimmana Kagga, known as Marula Muniyana Kagga. Marula Muniyana Kagga is practically the extension of Mankuthimmana Kagga. These are the stray poems of DVG which have been collected together and published after his death. There are 825 poems in this book, 120 poems less than the number of poems in Kagga.

Like the growing tail of
Hanuman in Lanka,
Questions and problems keep
Surging forth for this talkative,
a stammerer, Marula Muniya

No Comic story is this Kagga, nor
It is an emotional outpouring,
Stuff it is for cogitation in mind,
Enjoy each poem, one at a time, Marula Muniya

He also wrote Srimad BhagavadGeeta Tatparya, also known as Jeevana Dharma Yoga, which received the Sahitya Akademi Award. This commentary focuses on applying the philosophical concepts of the Bhagavad Gita to everyday life, framing the text as a practical guide for the general reader.

Vasantha Kusumanjali was the first collection of poems of DVG. Poems on popular personalities such as nationalists, social reformers, administrators, philanthropists and their activities have been included in this collection. The pen pictures of Tilak, Gokhale, Rabindranath Tagore, Visvesvaraya, Raja Ram Mohan Roy and Gandhi highlight the characteristic qualities of the personalities depicted. On the occasion of his birth centenary, all his works compiled in eleven volumes titled "D.V.G. Kriti Shreni", are jointly published by Department of Kannada and Culture and Karnataka Sahitya Academy. Very ably edited by late Dr. Ha.Ma. Nayak the volumes were published between 1990 and 2000. A second edition was brought out in 2005.

DVG served as the president of the 18th Kannada Sahitya Sammelana (Literary Conference) held in Madikeri in 1932.

DVG was a pioneer in writing biography in Kannada. He knew well that human traits were basic material for both creative writing and writing of biography. The book Dadabhai Navaroji that he wrote in 1950 is in a way his experiment with biographical writing. The first biography of Rangacharlu by DVG virtually reveals the author's abounding interest in politics, his deep public sympathy and his faith firmly rooted in democracy. These very values of the author were reiterated in his second biography of Gopalakrishna Gokhale.

Other than the biography of Diwan Rangacharlu, the biography of Gopalakrishna Gokhale by DVG is a much appreciated one. Gopalakrishna Gokhale had immense influence on DVG. He was in total agreement with Gokhale's principle, namely, "Public life must be spiritualized". This very fact led him to found the Gokhale Institute of Public Affairs later. In the preface to the biography, DVG wrote "I have written this book to enuciate some principles, ends and means in which I have full faith, implementation of which would do good to the people and society." Gokhale lived a frugal life. This quality along with the undivided commitment to finish the works being undertaken, heavily influenced DVG throughout his life. The biography of Gokhale saw many reprints and it was also prescribed as a textbook. Selected lectures of Gokhale were later added to it.

Beyond his individual biographies, DVG's largest work in this genre was Jnapakachitrashaale ("Art Gallery of Memories"), an eight-volume series of prose reminiscences written in the 1970s. It brings together character sketches of the many people he came to know over his lifetime, with individual volumes organized around a shared theme, such as Volume 3 (Sahityopasakaru), devoted to Kannada and Sanskrit literary scholars, and Volume 4 (Mysurina Diwanaru), covering the Dewans of Mysore.

DVG founded the Gokhale Institute of Public Affairs GIPA) located in Bull Temple Road, Basavanagudi and promoted fine arts of India. Sri Nittoor Srinivasa Rao, The then Chief Justice of Karnataka, Masti Venkatesa Iyengar, V.T.Srinivasan, the Principal of Vijaya College, Bengaluru were some of his close associates. DVG died on 7 October 1975. The road where his residence existed in Nagasandra road has been renamed as DVG Road in Basavanagudi.

== Journalism ==
DVG started his career in journalism in 1906–07. He started Kannada newspapers "Bharata" and "Karnataka". DVG started a weekly called "Sumathi" and a publication division called "Sumathi Granthamale" under which a dozen small books were published in the course of eight months. The biography of Diwan Rangacharlu was highly appreciated out of these."The Karnataka" started off as an English magazine to be published twice every week. With Diwan Visvesvaraya's help, he published the first issue of "The Karnataka" on 2 April 1913. After about a year, "The Karnataka" started publishing articles in Kannada. Many important books got an opening in the paper. The English paper earned him a lot of respect and honour from all quarters. DVG was forced to close the paper in 1921 due to want of sufficient support.

The book called Vrutta Patrike which was published in 1928 contained the codified quintessence of newspaper publication.

Among his books, the one on Political Science published in 1952 is outstanding. It was the first book of its kind to be published in Kannada. It deals with a variety of subjects relating to formation of state, characteristics of a responsible government, the concept of freedom, freedom of the people, weaknesses of democracy, impact of franchise, fundamental rights and economic policies and principles. A comprehensive coverage apart, the book contained forthright expression of opinions, and is often used as a book of reference for students of political science. Gundappa established the Gokhale Institute of Public Affairs (GIPA) at Bengaluru to facilitate a central meeting place for intellectuals, common folk, people with dissenting ideas and ideologies and critics to assemble under one roof to deliberate upon and discuss social issues. Gokhale Institute of Public Affairs is today chaired and managed by noted intellectual, writer and journalist S. R. Ramaswamy who shared a close proximity to D. V. G. for several years.

A nationalist shall not merely have control over the weaknesses of political nature but would cultivate the qualities of politeness and cordiality. Power without the fear of inquiry is like pickles without salt that would degenerate into a pit of worms, according to DVG. The fear of inquiry is the bodyguard of power administration. DVG has also written two books of the same genre, namely, Principles of Constitution and Probity in Public Life.

The first book traces the development of political science in the west in comparison with its growth in the east. It prescribes a standard of minimum education required for administration and citizens. The second one explains in delicate terms the political situation obtaining at present. It is normal nature of man not to exert himself. "Be relaxed, not to bother yourself, let it happen whatever that happens."

== Awards and honours ==
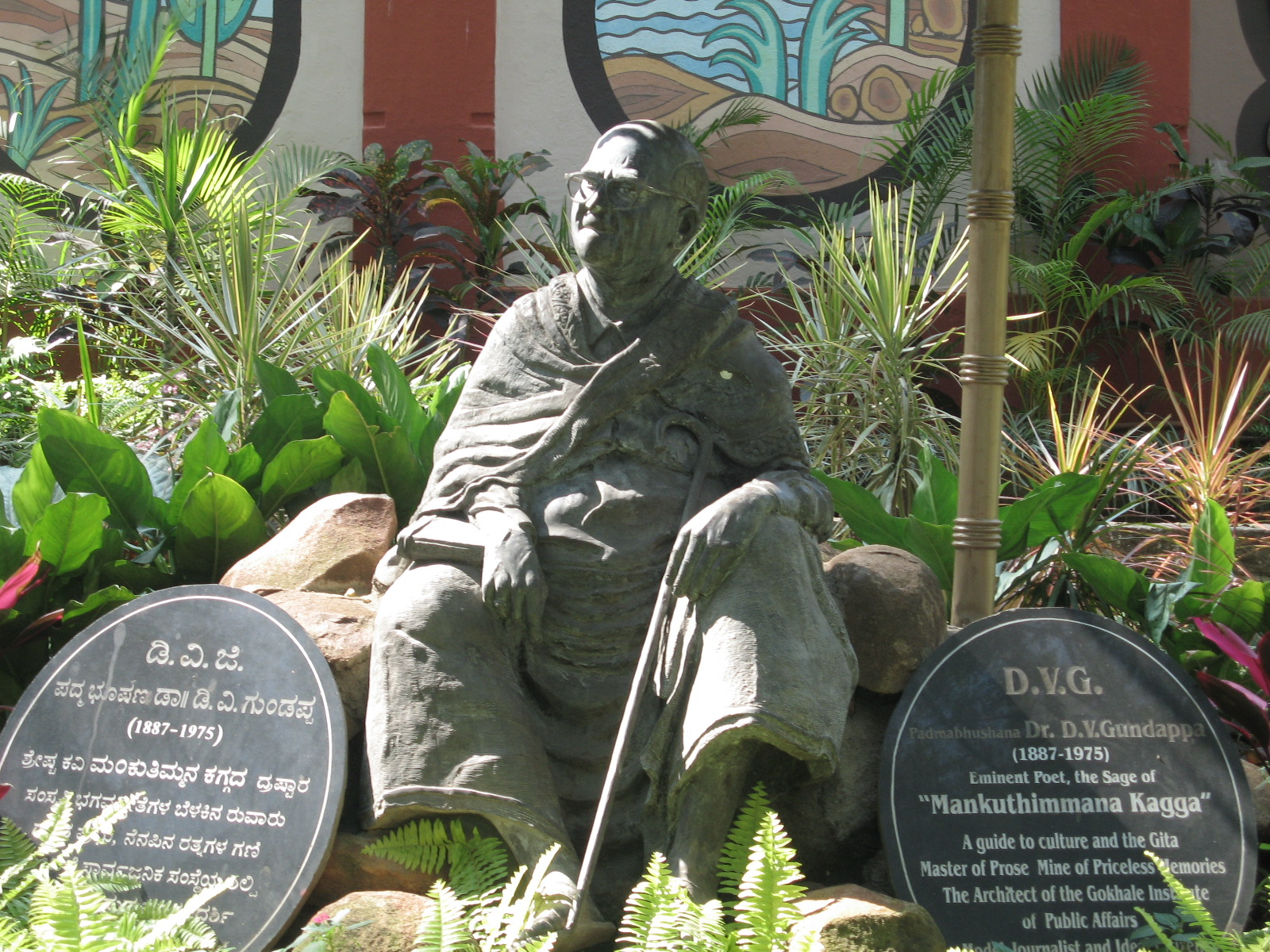
D.V. Gundappa's statue at Bugle Rock Park, Basavanagudi, Bengaluru.

Gundappa was awarded Padmabhushan by the Government of India in 1974. The State of Karnataka under Chief Minister Sri Veerandra Patil honored him for his services to Kannada literature in 1970 at Ravindra Kalakshetra, Bengaluru and awarded a purse of Rs 90,000. DVG donated the entire award money to the Gokhale Institute of Public Affairs. India Post issued a commemorative stamp of Dr. Gundappa in 1988.

He also Consider for Jnanpith Award by first selection board in 1965 but award is won by a Malayalam writer Sankara krupa.

In 2003, a statue was erected to honor DVG in Bugle Rock Park, Basavanagudi.

== Publications ==
=== Poetry ===
- Vasantha Kusumanjali (1922)
- Nivedana (1942)
- Kavite
- Umarana Osage
- Mankuthimmana Kagga
- Marula Muniyana Kagga
- Shri Rama PareekShaNaM
- Antahpura Geete
- Geetha Shaakuntala
- Kethaki Vana (1973)
- "Gauravisu Jeevanava"

=== Essays ===
- Jeevana saundarya mattu saahitya
- Saahitya Shakti
- Baaligondu Nambike

=== Drama (ನಾಟಕ) ===
- Vidhyaranya Vijaya
- Jack ked
- Macbeth
- Kanakaaluka
- Tilottamey

=== Biography ===
- Diwan Rangacharlu
- Gopalakrishna Gokhale
- Vidyaranyara Samakaleenaru
- Jnapaka chitra shaale 1 to Jnapaka chitra shaale 6
- Halavu mahaneeyaru
- Mysorina Divanaru
- Kalopasakaruu

=== Political science ===
- Rajyanga Tattvagalu
- Rajakeeya Prasangagalu 1 & 2
- Rajya Shastra
- Vrutta Patrike
- Principles of Constitution
- Probity in Public Life

=== Spiritual ===
- Purushasookta
- Devaru
- Rutha, Satya mattu Dharma
- Ishopanishat

=== Children's literature ===
- Indravajra
- Bekkoji
- Dewan Rangacharlu
- Gopal Krishna Gokhale

=== e-Publications ===
Gokhale Institute of Public Affairs has brought out all publications of D. V. Gundappa in the form of eBooks.

== See also ==
- B. G. L. Swamy
- Sir M. Visvesvaraya
- Karpur Srinivasa Rao
- Kannada Sahitya Parishat

== Cited sources ==
- K. M. George (1992). Modern Indian Literature, an Anthology: Plays and prose. Sahitya Akademi. ISBN 978-81-7201-324-0.
