= Krishna Raja Sagara =

Krishna Raja Sagara (kRS DAM)
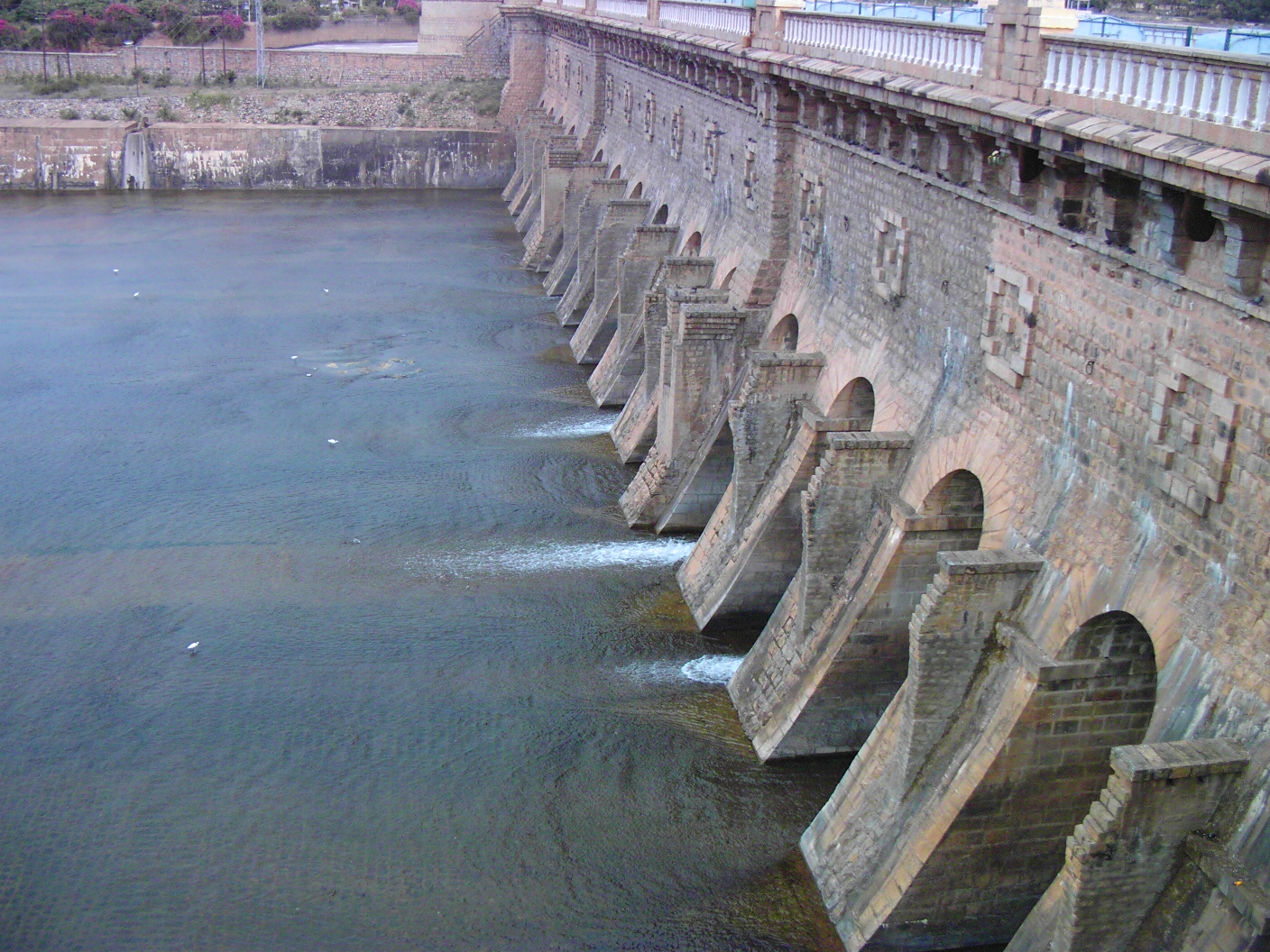
- Interactive map of Krishna Raja Sagara (kRS DAM)
- Country: India
- Location: Mandya, Karnataka
- Coordinates: 12°25′29″N 76°34′20″E
- Purpose: Water supply, irrigation
- Status: Operational
- Construction began: 1911
- Opening date: 1932
- Construction cost: ₹10.34 million (US$110,000)
- Operator: Cauvery Neeravari Nigam Limited

Dam and spillways
- Type of dam: Gravity dam
- Impounds: Kaveri River
- Height: 39.8 m (131 ft)
- Length: 2,620 m (8,600 ft)

Reservoir
- Creates: Krishna Raja Sagara
- Total capacity: 1,368,847,000 m^{3} (1,109,742 acre⋅ft)
- Active capacity: 124,421,000 m^{3} (100,870 acre⋅ft)
- Catchment area: 10,619 km^{2} (4,100 sq mi)
- Surface area: 129 km^{2} (50 sq mi)

Krishna Raja Sagara, also popularly known as KRS, is a lake and the dam that creates it. They are close to the settlement of Krishna Raja Sagara in the Indian State of Karnataka. The gravity dam made of surki mortar is below the confluence of river Kaveri with its tributaries Hemavati and Lakshmana Tirtha, in the district of Mandya.

Krishna Raja Wadiyar IV Maharaj of Mysore constructed the dam during the famine despite the critical financial condition of State. It was after him that the dam was named. There is an ornamental garden, Brindavan Gardens, attached to the dam.

== Background ==
The region of Mysore and especially Mandya had historically been dry and had witnessed mass migration to adjoining areas in the hot summers. A severe drought in 1875–76 had wiped out one-fifth of the population of the Kingdom of Mysore. Crop failures were common due to a lack of water for irrigation. The Kaveri river was seen as a potential source of irrigation water for the farmers in and around Mysore in the erstwhile Kingdom of Mysore.

=== Survey and plan ===
The Chief Engineer of Mysore, Sir. M. Visvesvaraya, faced opposition from the finance ministry of the government of Mysore, who said the project would "serve no purpose" and that the electricity produced from it would not be of complete use due to lack of demand. He then approached T. Ananda Rao, the Diwan of Mysore and the Maharaja Krishna Raja Wadiyar IV for a reconsideration. Upon examining, the latter gave his consent issuing an order on 11 October 1911 to begin the project and a sum of ₹81 lakh was set aside for it. Madras Presidency then opposed the project and urged the imperial government not to approve it. Upon Visvesvaraya's persuasion, the government consented. However, the initial plan to build a dam 194-feet high to hold an estimated 41,500,000,000 cu ft (1.18 km^{3}) of water had to be dropped.

=== Construction ===
Construction began in November 1911, and 10,000 workers were employed. A mortar known as surki was used in place of cement, as the latter was not manufactured in India at the time and importing would prove costly for the state. By the time construction was completed in 1931, around 5,000 to 10,000 persons had lost their homes to the project. However, they were rehabilitated and provided with agricultural land in the adjacent areas by the government.

== Operation ==
In place of spillways that prevent over-topping of dams, Visvesvaraya employed 48 automatic gates that open and close at the rise and fall of water in the reservoir, in six sets, with eight in each. Each gate consists of a sill, lintel, and side grooves and plates; balance weight; float; chains and pulleys; and inlet and outlet pipes. The gates are made of cast iron and were manufactured at the Visvesvaraya Iron and Steel Plant in Bhadravati.

The eight sets of gates are connected by means of chains and pulleys to a dead weight, which in turn is connected to a float, making up the 'balance weight' together, working inside a masonry well, both on the rear of the dam. The deadweight and float are placed one behind the other so as to have four gates on each side of it. When all eight gates close the sluice, the balance weight moves to the top of its swing and floats to the bottom of the well. The well has an inlet pipe 1 ft (0.30 m) in diameter from the reservoir that allows water in when the reservoir reaches the maximum permissible level causing the float to rise, and the balance weight to fall pulling the gates up and allowing discharge of water. In the same mechanism, the well gets emptied through an exit pipe when the water level in the reservoir falls.

== Dam ==
Foundation Stone to dam was laid on 11 November 1911. The dam was built across the river Kaveri in 1924. It is the main source of water for the districts of Mysore. The water is used for irrigation in Mysore and Mandya, and it is the main source of drinking water for all of Mysore, Mandya and almost the whole of Bengaluru city, the capital of Karnataka. The water released from this dam flows into the state of Tamil Nadu and is stored in Mettur dam in the Salem district.

== Brindavan Gardens ==
The Brindavan Gardens is a show garden that has a botanical park, with fountains, as well as boat rides beneath the dam. Brindavan gardens were built by Maharaja Jayachamarajendra Wadiyar.It was designed by German botanist Gustav Hermann Krumbiegel.

Diwan Sir Mirza Ismail of Mysore planned and built the gardens in connection with the construction of the dam.(citation needed) KRS Dam was the first to install automated Crest gates during 1920, which was initiated by Sir. Erwin who was British chief engineer. Display items include a musical fountain. Various biological research departments are housed here.

== Flora and fauna ==
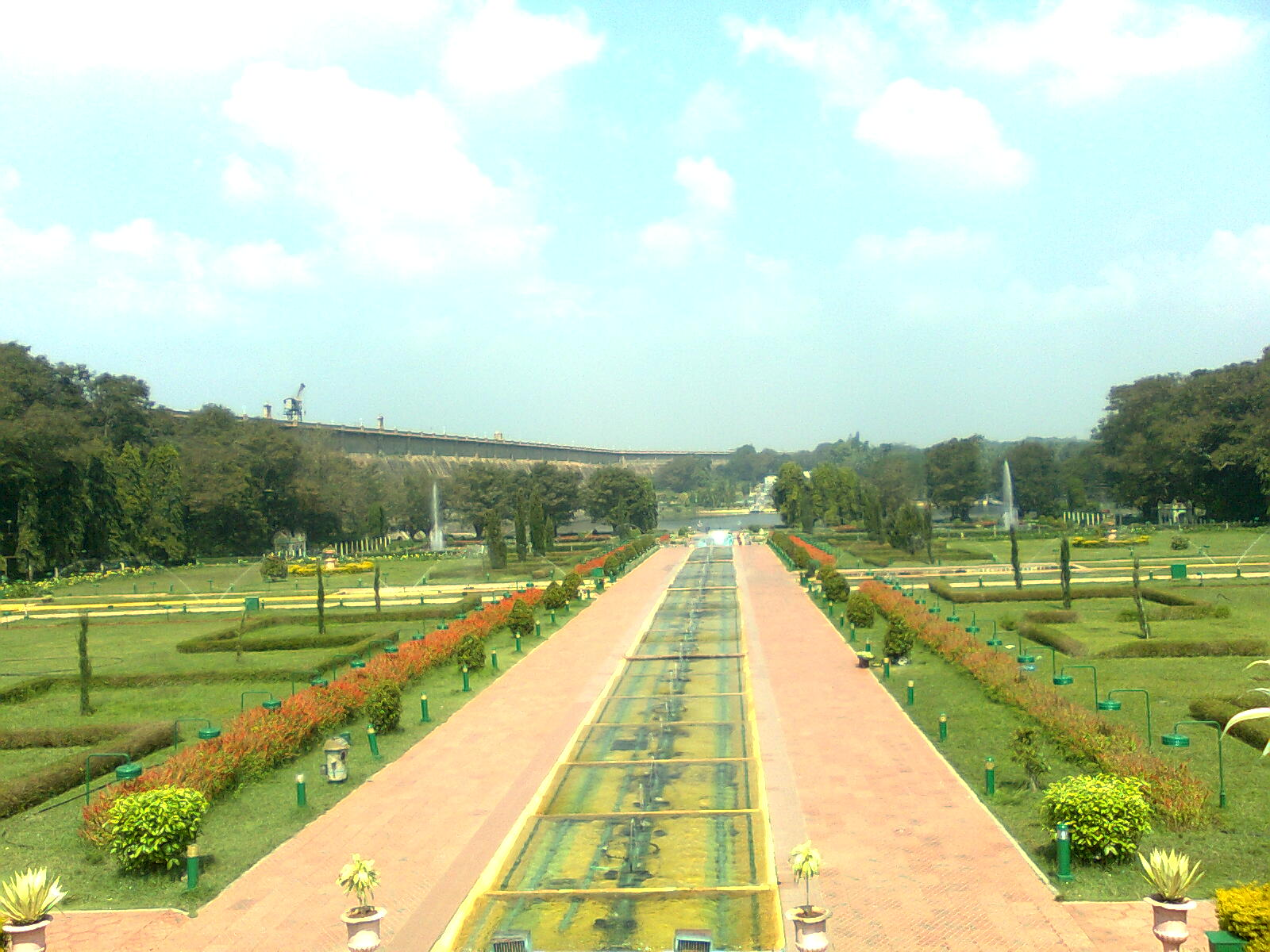
KRS Dam & Garden

The landscape of the area represents a complexity of agricultural land, rural habitation, sparingly spread trees and patches of original vegetation at the close by Ranganathittu Bird Sanctuary, which attracts wide varieties of local and migrant birds. Nearly 220 species of birds have been recorded here in large numbers.

== See also ==
- List of dams and reservoirs in India
- Karpur Srinivasa Rao
- Sir M. Visvesvaraya
- Maharaja Krishna Raja Wadiyar IV
