= Brindavan Express =

Train in India

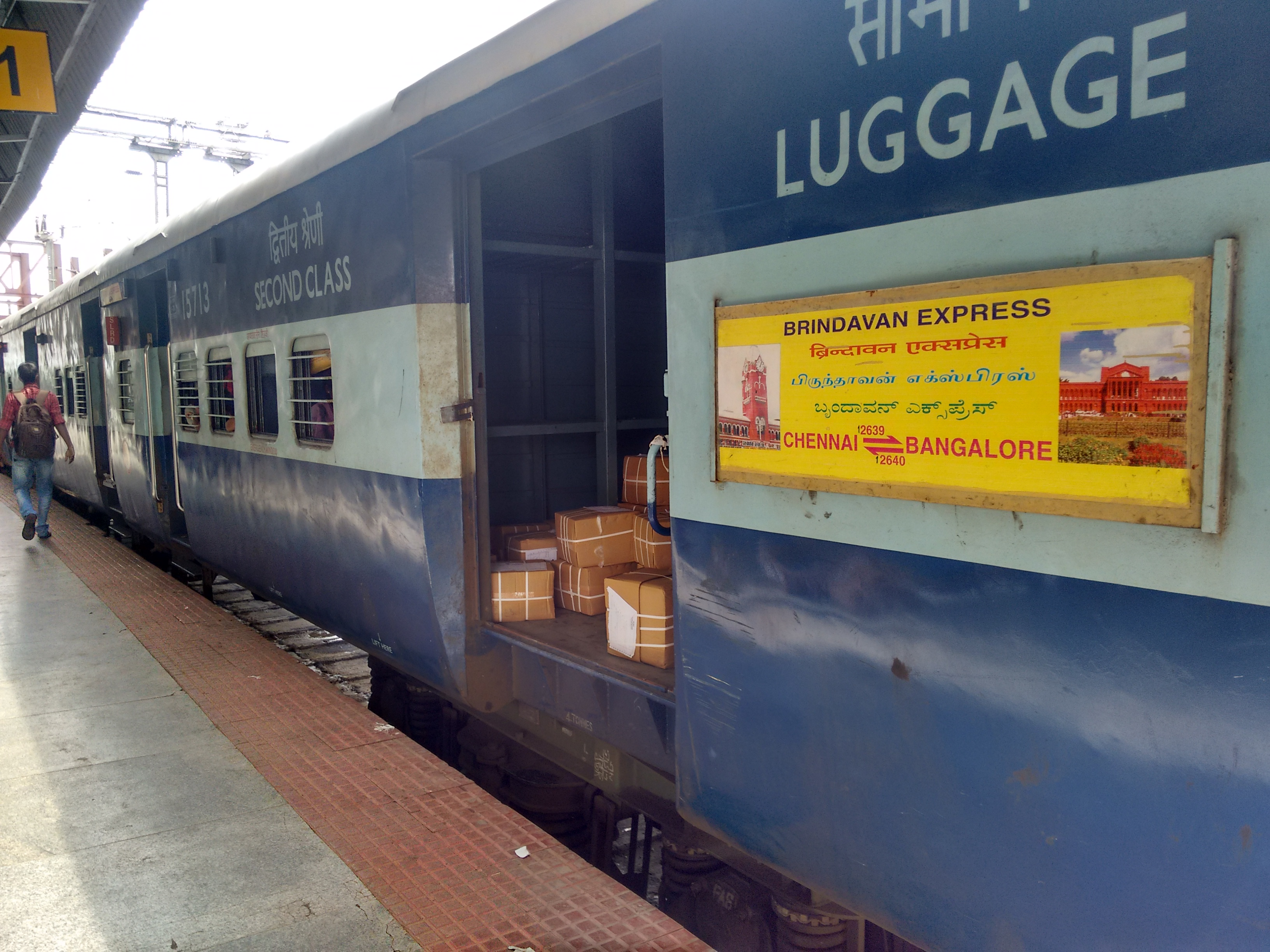
- Brindavan Superfast Express train board.

Overview
- Service type: Superfast Express
- First service: 1 October 1964; 61 years ago
- Current operator: Southern Railway

Route
- Termini: MGR Chennai Central (MAS); KSR Bengaluru City (SBC)
- Stops: 10
- Distance travelled: 359 km (223 mi)
- Average journey time: 6 hours 10 minutes
- Service frequency: Daily
- Train number: 12639 / 12640
- Line used: Chennai–Bangalore line

On-board services
- Classes: Chair Car, Second Class Seating, General Unreserved
- Disabled access: Disabled access
- Seating arrangements: Yes
- Sleeping arrangements: No
- Auto-rack arrangements: Overhead racks
- Catering facilities: E-catering
- Observation facilities: Large windows
- Baggage facilities: Available
- Other facilities: Below the seats

Technical
- Rolling stock: LHB coach
- Track gauge: 1,676 mm (5 ft 6 in)
- Operating speed: 58 km/h (36 mph) average including halts.
Route map
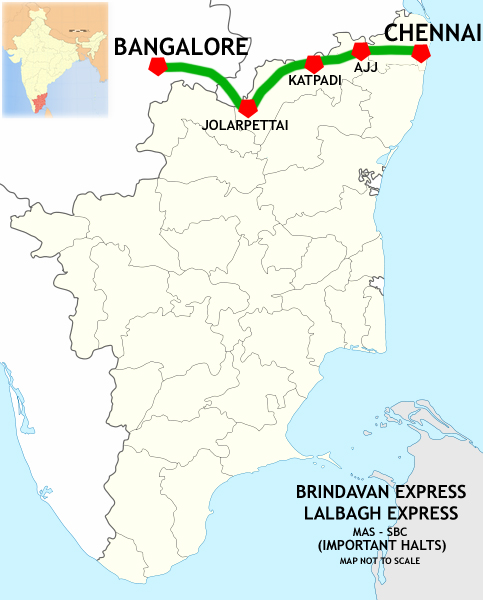

The 12639 / 12640 Brindavan Express is a superfast express train connecting Chennai Central (MAS) and Bengaluru City (SBC). It leaves Chennai Central at 07:40 and reaches Bengaluru City at 13:40 hours. In the reverse direction, it leaves Bengaluru City at 15:00 and reaches Central at 21:05 hours. The train has 22 coaches in its composition.

== History ==
The train is named after the Brindavan Gardens located near Mysore, which is a popular tourist attraction. This train introduced in the 1964 as the first intercity express in the Southern Railways. At that time it had stops only at Katpadi Junction and Jolarpettai Junction covering the 360 kilometres (220 mi) in 5 hours. Later due to derailments of some trains the speed was reduced to take 5.5 hours in the 1980s. With increase in stops it has now come to 6 hours. In the early 1980s the train was operated as double decker with ac and non-ac classes, which was later on scrapped, and the train was operated as single deck. In the late 1980s the MAS-JTJ stretch was electrified. JTJ-SBC the train used diesel engines. For the purpose of speed this train used to have twin diesels for the up gradient (deccan) between JTJ and SBC. The Train celebrated its Golden Jubilee run on 1 October 2014.

== Loco link ==
earlier before the electrified line stretch and LHB coaches upgrade this train used to run with Diesel Traction and ICF rakes like Tondiarpet-based WDM-3A. now This train is currently hauled by WAP-4, WAP-7 class electric locomotive maintained by Electric Loco Shed Arakkonam, Royapuram of Southern Railway.

== Train timings ==
This train is a daily service train with the following departures and arrivals at some of these stations:-

MGR Chennai Central ↔ KSR Bengaluru City Jn (Brindavan Express)
12639		Station Name	Station Code	12640	
Arrival	Departure	Station Name	Station Code	Arrival	Departure
-	07:40	Chennai Central	MAS	21:10	-
--SKIP--		Perambur	PER	20:33	20:35
08:38	08:40	Arakkonam Junction	AJJ	19:43	19:45
08:58	09:00	Sholinghur	SHU	19:18	19:20
09:13	09:15	Walajah Road Junction	WJR	19:03	19:05
09:38	09:40	Katpadi Junction	KPD	18:43	18:45
10:18	10:20	Ambur	AB	17:58	18:00
10:33	10:35	Vaniyambadi	VN	17:43	17:45
10:53	10:55	Jolarpettai Junction	JTJ	17:28	17:30
11:39	11:40	Kuppam	KPN	16:43	16:45
12:09	12:11	Bangarapet Junction	BWT	16:14	16:15
12:50	12:52	Krishnarajapuram	KJM	15:32	15:34
13:08	13:10	Bangalore Cantonment	BNC	15:20	15:22
13:40	-	Bengaluru City	SBC	-	15:10

== Rakes ==
Earlier with ICF coaches, the train had dedicated rake. Upon launch of LHB coach, the rakes are now shared with Kovai Express (12675/12676).

- 3 Second Class Sitting (Unreserved)
- 13 Second-Class Sitting (Reserved)
- 2 AC Chair Car
- 1 Pantry Car
- 1 EOG
- 1 LSLRD

== See also ==
- Chennai Central–Bengaluru City Shatabdi Express
- Lal Bagh Express
- Chennai–Bangalore Double Decker Express
