= Hongahalli, Mandya =

Hongahalli Krishnaraja Sagara
- Town
- Location in Karnataka, India
- Coordinates: 12.407342°N 76.576927°E
- Country: India
- State: Karnataka
- District: Mandya
- Named after: Krishna Raja Sagara
- Talukas: Shrirangapattana

Government
  - Body: Grama Panchayath

Area
  - Total: 6.13 km^{2} (2.37 sq mi)
- Elevation: 800 m (2,600 ft)

Population (2011)
  - Total: 9,047
  - Density: 1,480/km^{2} (3,820/sq mi)

Languages
  - Official: Kannada
- Time zone: UTC+5:30 (IST)
- PIN: 571607
- Vehicle registration: KA-11
- Lok Sabha constituency: Mandya Lok Sabha constituency
- Vidhan Sabha constituency: Shrirangapattana Assembly constituency

Hongahalli is a census town (as per Census 2011, its location code number is 614310) located at the southwestern border of Mandya district towards Mysuru district. It is famously known as Krishnaraja Sagara, due to KRS dam located here in this village. It is located about 20 kilometers northwest of Mysuru city in the Shrirangapattana taluk.

It can be reached by two roads; Yelwal - Srirangapattana Road and Pandavapura - KRS Road. Nearest railway station is Krishnarajasagar (Station Code:KJS), but Mysuru Junction railway station is the most feasible option.
