= Gustav Hermann Krumbiegel =

German botanist and garden designer

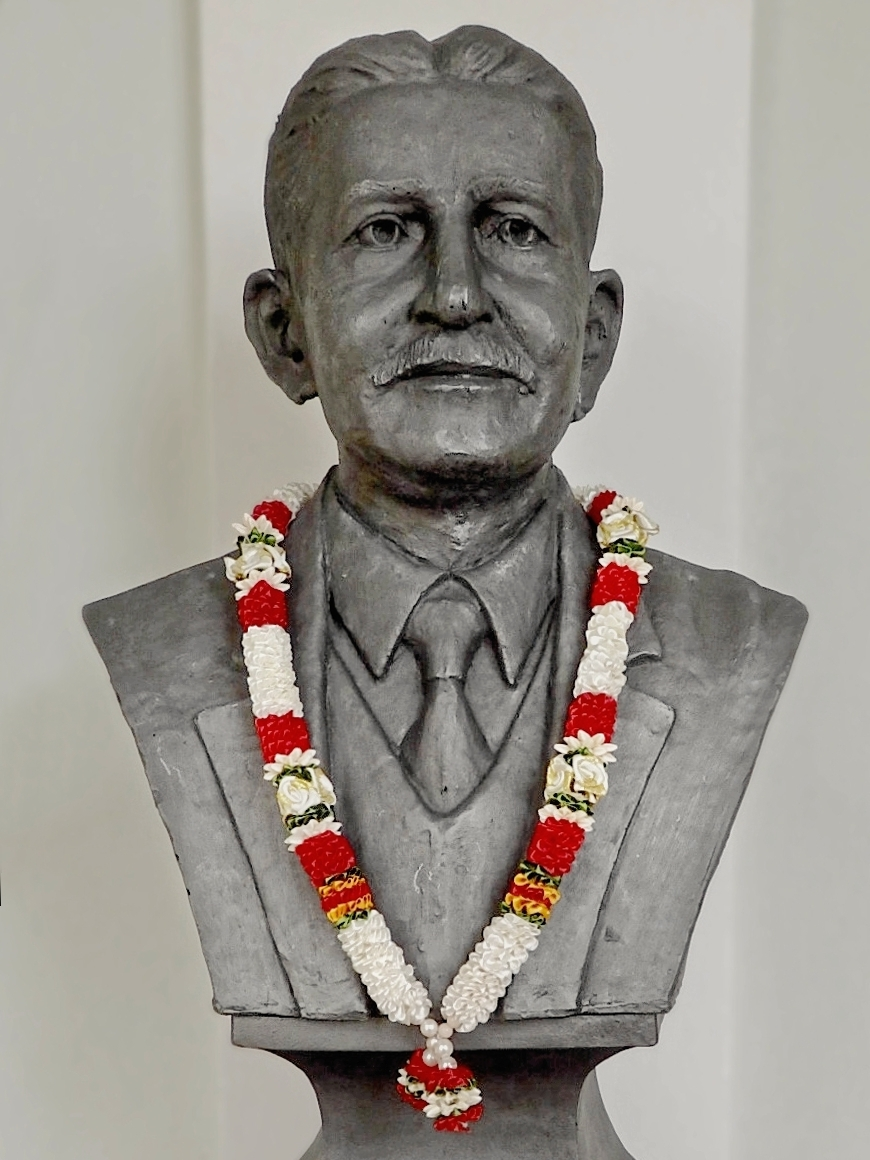
Bust of Krumbiegel

Gustav Hermann Krumbiegel (18 December 1865 – 8 February 1956) was a German botanist and garden designer who was best known for his work at the Lal Bagh Botanical Gardens in Bangalore and for the planning of the avenues of Bangalore. He also established the first horticultural training school in India.

== Life and work ==
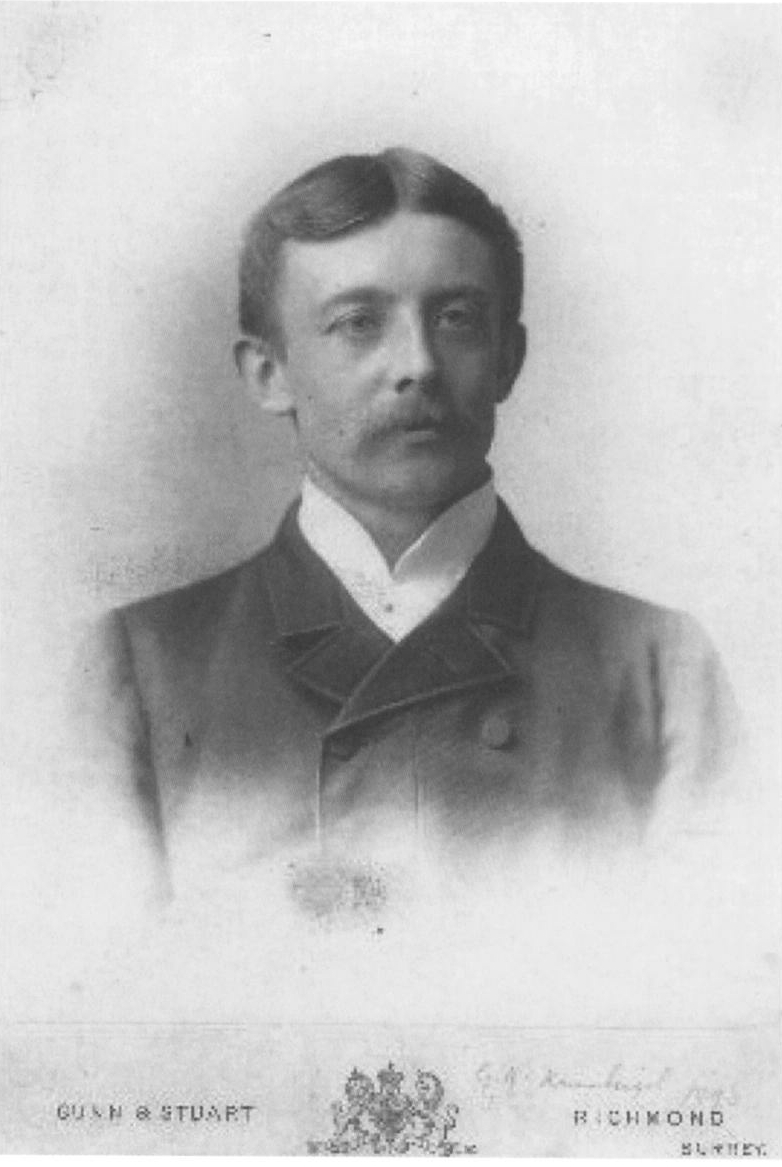
Carte-de-visite from Krumbiegel's English period

Krumbiegel was born in Lohmen near Dresden, and his early studies were in Wilsdruff and Dresden after which he trained in horticulture in Pillnitz. In 1884 he worked in Schwerin and from 1885 to 1887 he worked as a landscape gardener in Hamburg. In 1888, he moved to England, designing flower beds at Hyde Park and became a staff at the Royal Botanical Gardens in Kew. He then took up a position in 1893 with the princely state of Baroda as Curator of the botanical gardens after the retirement of J.M. Henry (1841–1937). He also worked with the Government Botanical Gardens at Ootacamund and was responsible for redesign of the architecture. In 1907 he took a better offer from Krishnaraja Wodeyar, the ruler of Mysore to serve him and was the only one given the courtesy of handshaking the ruler. He succeeded John Cameron at the Lal Bagh Gardens as an economic botanist and superintendent. He introduced numerous plants and was involved in the design of the Brindavan Gardens which revived the Mughal style of gardening. He was also involved with the Mysore Horticultural Society that was started in 1912. Although outside his key work area, he was often involved in architectural design. The Dewan of Mysore appointed him as an architectural consultant despite protests from the British Resident in Mysore. During the Second World War, Germans in India were declared as enemies and Krumbiegel was, along with other Germans, held at an internment camp in Bangalore. As a consulting architect, he introduced regulations for protection of old monuments, and examined designs of new buildings including the guesthouse for the Maharaja of Mysore, a pavilion in the municipal park of Kolar and for the British Residency at Quetta. He also served as a visiting professor of Architecture and Civic Design at the College of Engineering of Mysore.

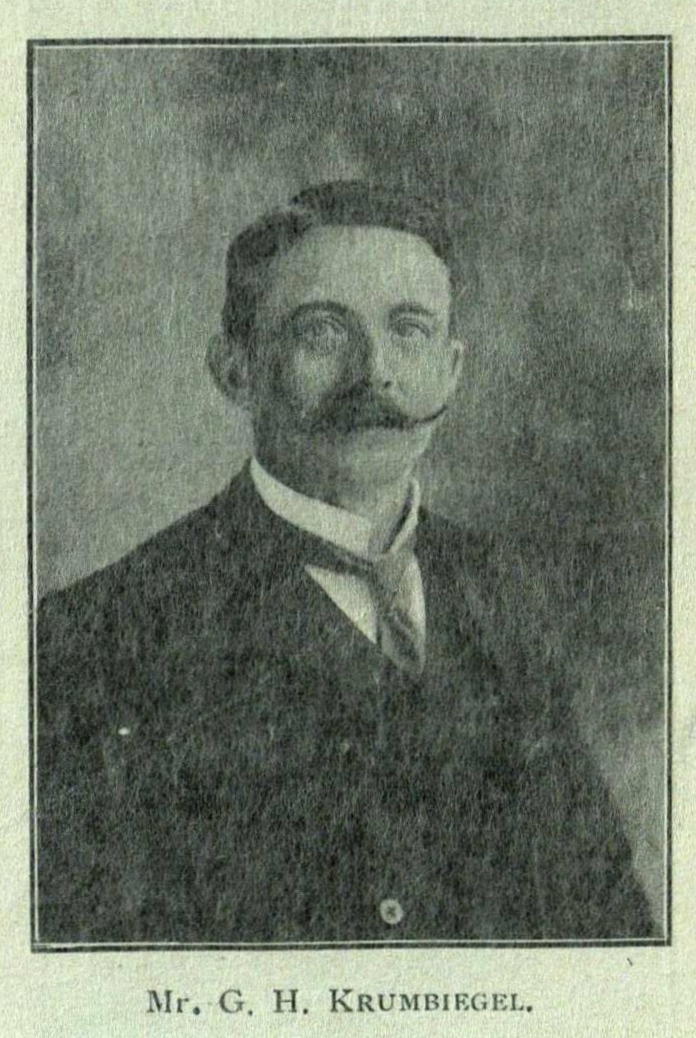

He obtained seeds from other countries and sent collections in return to Kew and the United States of America. These included Indian specialities such as bamboo rice, varieties of rice, mango and others. Krumbiegel introduced many plants using his connections and these included Rhodes grass, Russian sunflower, soya bean, American maize, Mesquite beans, saltbush, velvet beans and styrax balsam, Acacia dealbata from Africa, Feijoa sellowiana from Paris, Elaeocarpus bancroftii from Australia, Canarium commune from the Philippines, Ceiba pentandra from Burma, Cedrela odorata, Amherstia nobilis from Singapore, Malphigia glabra from the Caribbean, Japan, Chenopodium ambrosioides from Budapest, Hydnocarpus Thailand, and Livistonia australis from Java. He was among the seventeen founders of The Mythic Society, begun in 1909 and he worked as its treasurer for a while. He cofounded the Mysore Horticultural Society in 1912.

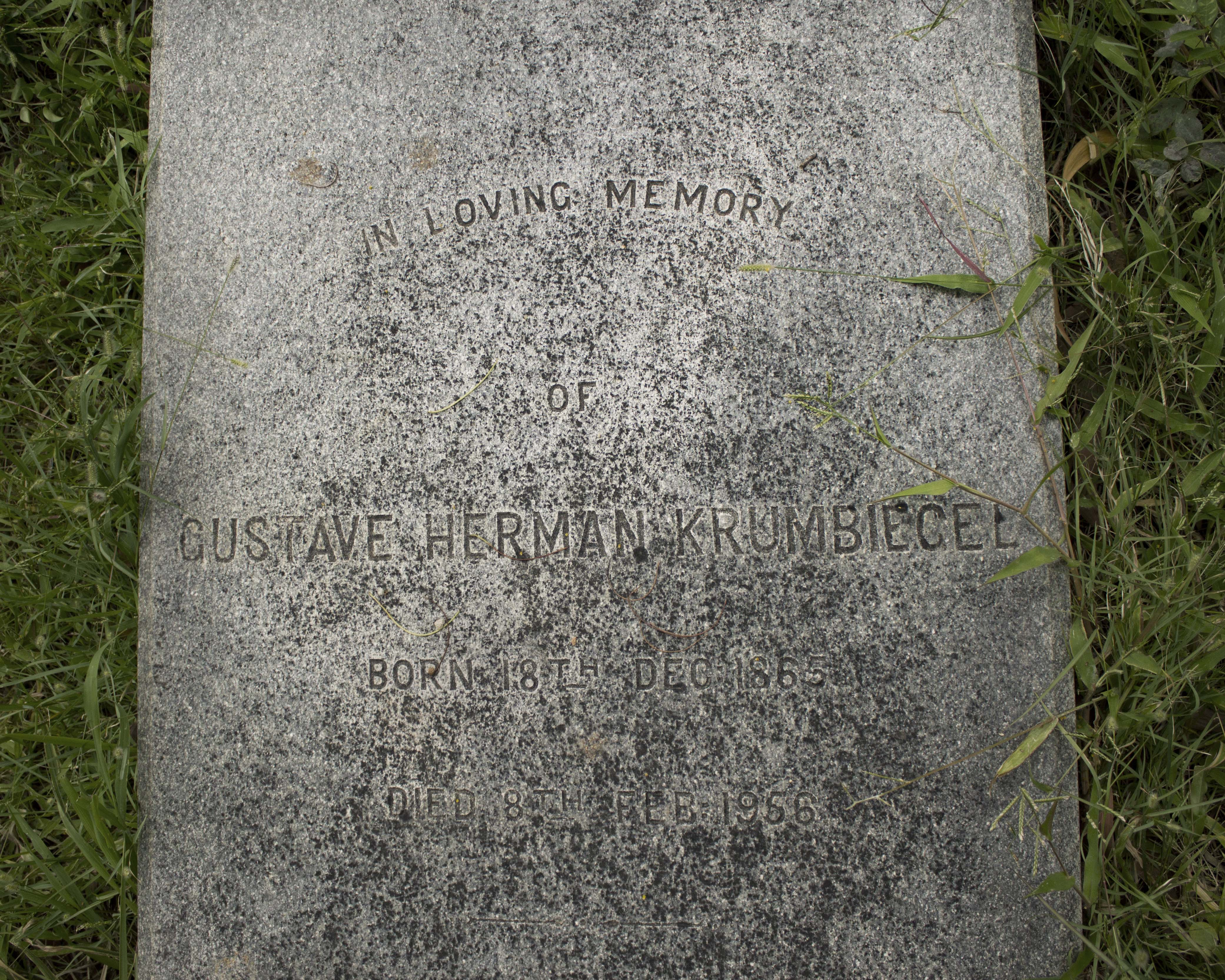
Gravestone of Gustav Hermann Krumbiegel at Bangalore

Apart from his work with horticulture and economic botany, he was responsible in the introduction of many ornamental plants and flowering trees and was involved in the choice of avenue trees for Bangalore. The road adjoining the Lal Bagh botanical garden is named after him as Krumbiegel Road.

== Later years and honours ==
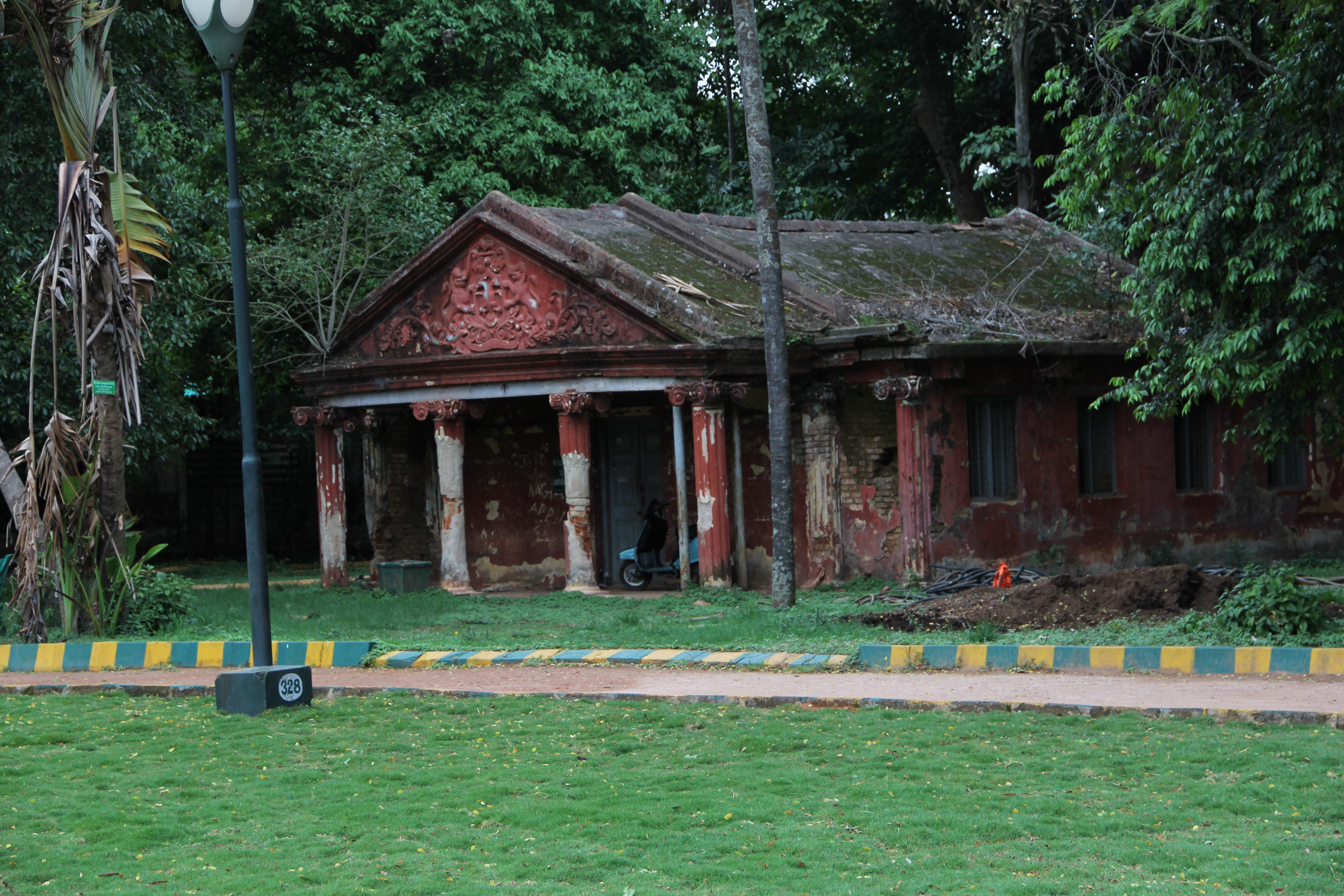
Krumbiegel hall in Lal Bagh before its demolition

After 1932, Krumbiegel continued to live in Bangalore, working as consulting architect and advisor in town planning and horticulture, till his death in 1956. He was buried at the Methodist cemetery on Hosur Road, Bangalore. Krumbiegel Road, located between the main and the West gate of Lalbagh is named after him.

In 2016, 60 years after his death, Krumbiegel's grave was given a facelift by the government of Karnataka in honour of his contributions.

== Other sources ==
- Anon. Journal of the Mysore Horticultural Society, Issue 1, 1956 (obituary)
