= List of villages in Kolar district =

This is an alphabetical list of villages in Kolar district, Karnataka, India.

== A–Ad ==
- A. Upparahalli
- A. Vyapalapalli
- Aalamaram
- Abakavaripalli
- Abbani
- Abbenahalli
- Abbigirihosahalli
- Abbihalli
- Achaganapalli
- Achampalli (Mulbagal)
- Achampalli (Srinivaspur)
- Achampally
- Achatnahalli
- Achepalli
- Adampalli
- Adavichambakur
- Adavigollavarahalli
- Addagal (Srinivaspur)
- Addekoppa
- Adepalli
- Adiganapalli
- Adikarahatti
- Adinarayanahalli
- Adirajapalli

== Ag–Av ==
- Agalakote (Malur)
- Agara, Malur
- Agara, Mulbagal
- Agatamdike
- Agnihalli
- Agrahara Somarasanahalli
- Agrahara, Chintamani
- Agrahara, Malur
- Agrahara, Srinivaspur
- Agraharahosahalli
- Ahanya
- Ajjakadirenahalli
- Ajjapalli, Bangarapet
- Ajjapalli, Kolar
- Ajjappanahalli, Malur
- Ajjavara, Chik Ballapur
- Akalathimmanahalli
- Akkimangala
- Akshantaragollahalli
- Allipura
- Andersonpet
- Ankathatti
- Araleri
- Avani, Kolar

== Balagere ==
- Budikote
- Byrakur
- Chelur
- Devarayasamudra
- Doddakallahalli
- Gattahalli
- Gownipalli
- Guttahalli, Bangarapet North
- Guttahalli, Bangarapet South
- Guttahalli, Kolar Gold Fields
- Guttahalli, Kolar South
- Guttahalli, Kolar West
- Hebbani
- Hossur
- Hulkuru
- Huthur

== J–K ==
- Jagadenahalli
- Jangamakote
- Jogal Kasti
- Kalkunte
- Kanchala
- Kataripalya
- Kolakunjanahalli
- Kurudumale
- Kyalanur

== M–P ==
- Maasti
- Manchenahalli
- Mandikal
- Marandahalli, Kolar
- Marasanapalli
- Masthi
- Mullur
- Nangali
- Padakasti
- Palar Nagar

== R–Z ==
- Rampura
- Tayalur
- Therhalli
- Uttanur
