= Abbaludu =

- village
- Location in Karnataka, India Abbaludu (India)
- Coordinates: 13.4386300°N 77.854430°E
- Country: India
- State: Karnataka
- District: Chikkaballapura
- Taluka: Sidlaghatta

Government
  - Body: Village Panchayat

Languages
  - Official: Kannada
- Time zone: UTC+5:30 (IST)
- Nearest city: Chikkaballapur
- Civic agency: Village Panchayat

Abbaludu is a village in the southern state of Karnataka, India located in the Sidlaghatta taluk of Chikkaballapura district (formerly Kolar district).
