= Hosahudya =

- village
- Location in Karnataka, India
- Coordinates: 13°47′55.22″N 77°46′25.91″E
- Country: India
- State: Karnataka
- District: Chikballapur district

Area
  - Total: 8.9334 km^{2} (3.4492 sq mi)
- Elevation: 678 m (2,224 ft)

Population (2011)
  - Total: 1,625
  - Density: 181.9/km^{2} (471.1/sq mi)

Languages
  - Official: Kannada
- Time zone: UTC+5:30 (IST)
- PIN: 561207

Hosahudya is a village located in Bagepalli of Chikkaballapura district, Karnataka, India. About 3 kilometres (1.9 miles) away is the town of Bagepalli. There are 1625 people, 813 male and 812 female, living in 419 households.

Hosahudya village is administrated by a sarpanch, in accordance with the Panchyati Raaj Act and the Constitution of India.

== Population ==
The 2011 census information is:

Description	Total	Male	Female
Total number of houses	419	-	-
Population	1,625	813	812
Child (0-6)	205	109	96
Schedule caste	591	297	294
Schedule tribe	110	49	61
Literacy	54.23 %	65.06 %	43.58 %
Total workers	793	498	295
Main workers	776	0	0
Marginal workers	17	9	8
