= Ahanya =

Ahanya Ahanya Village
- village
- Ahanya is in Kolar district
- Country: India
- State: Karnataka
- District: Kolar
- Talukas: Malur

Government
  - Body: Village Panchayat

Languages
  - Official: Kannada
- Time zone: UTC+5:30 (IST)
- Nearest city: Kolar
- Civic agency: Village Panchayat

Ahanya is a village in the southern state of Karnataka, India. It is located in the Malur taluk of Kolar district in Karnataka. It is located at the border of Karnataka and Tamil Nadu.

== See also ==
- Kolar
- Districts of Karnataka
