= Agatamdike =

agatamadaka
- village
- Interactive map of agatamadaka
- Coordinates: 13.7928°N 77.9565°E
- Country: India
- State: Karnataka
- District: chickballapura
- Talukas: Bagepalli

Government
  - Body: Village Panchayat

Languages
  - Official: Kannada
- Time zone: UTC+5:30 (IST)
- Nearest city: chickballapura
- Civic agency: Village Panchayat

Agatamadaka is a village in the southern state of Karnataka, India. It is located in the Bagepalli taluk of Chickballapur district in Karnataka.

== See also ==
- Kolar, Karnataka
- Districts of Karnataka
