= Hulkur =

- village
- Location in Karnataka, India Hulkur (India)
- Coordinates: 12.955903298509934°N 78.01078787820444°E
- Country: India
- State: Karnataka
- District: Kolar
- Taluk: Malur

Government
  - Type: Panchayati raj (India)
  - Body: Gram panchayat

Population
  - Total: 823

Languages
  - Official: Kannada
- Time zone: UTC+5:30 (IST)
- Telephone code: 08151
- ISO 3166 code: IN-KA
- Vehicle registration: KA
- 2011 census code: 622226
- Website: karnataka.gov.in

Hulkur is a small village in the Malur Taluk of Kolar district in Karnataka, India. It is situated about 13 kilometers from Malur.

== Demographics ==
According to the 2011 Indian Census, the village consists of 823 people. The town has a literacy rate of 64.52 percent which is lower than Karnataka's average of 75.36 percent.

Total Number of Household : 192
Population	Persons	Males	Females
Total	823	424	399
In the age group 0–6 years	89	53	36
Scheduled Castes (SC)	191	89	102
Scheduled Tribes (ST)	77	39	38
Literates	531	302	229
Illiterate	292	122	170
Total Worker	363	242	121
Main Worker	270	221	49
Marginal Worker	93	21	72
Non Worker	460	182	278
