= Addekoppa =

- village
- Interactive map of Addekoppa
- Coordinates: 13.4869° N, 77.5978° E 13.4856°N 77.5966°E
- Country: India
- State: Karnataka
- District: Chikkaballapur
- Talukas: Manchenahalli

Government
  - Body: Village Panchayat

Area
  - Total: 1.3038 km^{2} (0.5034 sq mi)

Population (2011)
  - Total: 758
  - Density: 581/km^{2} (1,510/sq mi)

Languages
  - Official: Kannada
- Time zone: UTC+5:30 (IST)
- Postal code: 561211
- Nearest city: Gauribidanur
- Civic agency: Village Panchayat
- Sex Ratio: 1021 female / 1000 male
- Literacy Rate: 66.67%

Addekoppa is a village in the southern state of Karnataka, India. It is located in the Manchenahalli taluk of Chikkaballapura district in Karnataka.

== See also ==
- Kolar
- Districts of Karnataka
