= Kanaganakoppa =

Coordinates: 13.48362°N 77.612719°E

Kanaganakoppa Kanakanakoppa
- village
- Interactive map of Kanaganakoppa
- Country: India
- State: Karnataka
- District: Chikkaballapur

Government
  - Body: Gram panchayat

Population
  - Total: 1,290

Languages
  - Official: Kannada telugu
- Time zone: UTC+5:30 (IST)
- PIN: 561211
- Telephone code: 08155
- ISO 3166 code: IN-KA
- Vehicle registration: KA-
- Nearest city: Chikballapur and Bangalore
- Lok Sabha constituency: Chikballapur
- Avg. summer temperature: 37 °C (99 °F)
- Avg. winter temperature: 19 °C (66 °F)
- Website: karnataka.gov.in

Kanaganakoppa is a village in Chikkaballapur district of Karnataka, India, 73 km from Bangalore.
