= Araleri =

Village in Karnataka, India

- Grama Panchayat
- Location in Karnataka, India
- Coordinates: 12.9844°N 77.9861°E
- Country: India
- State: Karnataka
- District: Kolar district

Area
  - Total: 4.57 km^{2} (1.76 sq mi)
- Elevation: 909 m (2,982 ft)

Population (2001)
  - Total: 1,650

Languages
  - Official: Kannada
  - Regional: Kannada
- Time zone: UTC+5:30 (IST)
- PIN: 563 130
- Telephone code: 08151

Araleri (Kannada: ಅರಳೇರಿ) is a gram panchayat village in Karnataka, India. Araleri is located in Malur Taluk of Kolar district which is also one of the constituency of Kolar Jilla Panchayat and Malur Taluk Panchayat, at a distance of 6 km from the town of Malur and 32 km from Kolar.

== Villages in Araleri Gram Panchayat ==
Angasettihalli	Araleri
Bingipura	Chakanahalli
Geragadenahalli	Hulkur
Karikuchanahalli	Kundenahalli
Malur	Medahatti
Menasinatha	Mittiganahalli
Neelakanta Agrahara	Upparahalli
Veerapura
