= Jangamakote =

- village
- Location in Karnataka, India Jangamakote (India)
- Coordinates: 13°16′N 77°51′E
- Country: India
- State: Karnataka
- District: Chickaballapur
- Talukas: Sidlaghatta

Population (2001)
  - Total: 5,842

Languages
  - Official: Kannada
- Time zone: UTC+5:30 (IST)

Jangamakote is a village in the southern state of Karnataka, India. It is located in the Sidlaghatta taluk of Chikkaballapur district in Karnataka.

This is a Holbli headquarter. "Kote" in the name has meaning of fort, the village was surrounded by a fort which currently worn out or ruined.

The village has an old "Someshwara" temple. The Draupadi ammana Karaga is celebrated every year on the same day every year when the famous Bangalore Karaga takes place.

== Demographics ==
As of 2001 India census, Jangamakote had a population of 5842 with 2986 males and 2856 females.

== See also ==
- Chikkaballapur
- Districts of Karnataka
