= Ajjappanahalli, Malur =

Ajjappanahalli
- village
- Ajjappanahalli, Malur is in Kolar district
- Country: India
- State: Karnataka
- District: Kolar
- Talukas: Malur

Government
  - Body: Village Panchayat

Languages
  - Official: Kannada
- Time zone: UTC+5:30 (IST)
- Nearest city: Kolar
- Civic agency: Village Panchayat

Ajjappanahalli, Malur is a village in the southern state of Karnataka, India. It is located in the Malur taluk of Kolar district in Karnataka.

== See also ==
- Kolar, Karnataka
- Districts of Karnataka
