= Achepalli =

Coordinates: 13°45′N 77°53′E

- village
- Interactive map of Achepalli
- Country: India
- State: Karnataka
- District: Kolar
- Talukas: Bagepalli

Government
  - Body: Village Panchayat

Languages
  - Official: Kannada
- Time zone: UTC+5:30 (IST)
- Nearest city: Kolar
- Civic agency: Village Panchayat

Achepalli is a village in the southern state of Karnataka, India. It is located in the Bagepalli taluk of Chikkaballapur district in Karnataka.

== See also ==
- Chikkaballapur
- Districts of Karnataka
