= Thollapalli =

Coordinates: 13.7874°N 77.9471°E

Thollapalli is a small hamlet in Karnataka (near Pathapalya), Chikkaballapur district, India. Surrounding villages are Agatamadaka & Gummanayakana Palya.

Educational institutions in the area include National College Bagepalli and Govt-Junior College Bagepalli.

== Notable places ==
1. Gummanayakana Kote
2. History of Polegars
3. Agatamadakkamma Temple built by Late Venkata Shiva Reddy
4. Sree rama temple
5. Sai Temple
