= Achatnahalli =

- village
- Achatnahalli location in Karnataka, India
- Coordinates: 13°03′42″N 77°35′28″E
- Country: India
- State: Karnataka
- District: Kolar
- Talukas: Kolar

Government
  - Body: Village Panchayat

Languages
  - Official: Kannada
  - Unofficial: Urdu, Tamil, Telugu
- Time zone: UTC+5:30 (IST)
- PIN: 563133
- Nearest city: Kolar
- Civic agency: Village Panchayat

Achatnahalli is a village in the Kolar taluk of the southern state of Karnataka, India and within the Division of Bangalore. As of the 2011 Indian Census, the village included a total population of 520 people consisting of 266 females and 254 males. The census also noted the village held a total of 129 households.

== Politics ==
Under the Indian Constitution and the 1993 Karnataka Panchayat Raj Act the village elects a Gram Panchayat with a Sarpanch as its leader, to act as village administrators and representatives.

The village falls under the Kolar Assembly Constituency, represented by Vartoor R Prakash of the Independent Party since 2008. It also falls within the Kolar (Lok Sabha constituency), which is currently represented by K. H. Muniyappa of the Indian National Congress. The major political parties competing in Achatnahalli are the Indian National Congress, Bharatiya Janata Party, and Janata Dal (Secular).

== Demographics ==
The population of Achatnahalli as of the 2011 Indian Census breaks down as follows:

Demographic	Percentage of Total Population	Raw Total	Male	Female
0–6 years old	11.73%	61	25	36
Total Workers	33.65%	175	165	10
Full Time Workers	100% of total employed	175	165	10
Scheduled Cast Membership	5.19%	27	14	13
Scheduled Tribe Membership	0%	0	0	0

The village has a substantially higher female population than the surrounding state of Karnataka, with Achatnahalli's ratio of female to male standing at 1047:1000, in contrast to Karnataka's 973:1000. This ratio is even greater among children and young people, with the ratio of females to males among village young people at 1440:1000, as against Karnataka's 948:1000.

The aggregate literacy of the village is 67.97%, with 81.66% of males and 54.35% of females literate according to the Census definition. This is a lower rate of literacy than Karnataka where literacy is at an average of 75.36%. Gurpreet

== Industry ==
The primary industry of Achatnahalli is farming and cultivation. Of the 175 total workers in 2011, 113 were cultivators (owners or co-owners of farm properties) while nine were agricultural labourers.

== Location ==
The village is located eighteen kilometres west of Kolar, the regional centre. It stands fifty two kilometres from the state capital, Bangalore. Surrounding towns include Narasapura, Vokkaleri, Hungenahalli, Shivarapatna, and Chowdadenahalli, each within ten kilometres. The taluk in which Achatnahalli resides is surrounded by the Malur taluk to the south, the Hoskote taluk to the west, the Bangalore Rural taluk to the south east, and the Vijayapura taluk to the north. The primary post office serving the village is located in Narasapura.

== See also ==
- Kolar
- Districts of Karnataka
