= Allipura =

Alipur Alipur
- Town
- Location in Karnataka, India Alipur (India)
- Coordinates: 13.4852400°N 77.4621000°E
- Country: India
- State: Karnataka
- District: Chikkaballapura
- Talukas: Gauribidanur

Population (2011)
  - Total: 9,930

Languages
  - Official: KannadaTelugu Urdu
- Time zone: UTC+5:30 (IST)

Allipura is a village in the south of Karnataka, India. It is located in the Gauribidanur taluk of Chikkaballapura district.

== Demographics ==
As of 2011 India census, Allipura had a population of 9930 with 5119 males and 4811 females.

== See also ==
- Districts of Karnataka
- Kadalaveni
