= Kyalanur =

Coordinates: 13°16′N 77°59′E

- village
- Interactive map of Kyalanur
- Country: India
- State: Karnataka
- District: Kolar
- Talukas: Kolar

Population (2001)
  - Total: 6,493

Languages
  - Official: Kannada
- Time zone: UTC+5:30 (IST)

Kyalanur is a village in the southern state of Karnataka, India. It is located in the Kolar taluk of Kolar district in Karnataka.

== Demographics ==
As of 2001 India census, Kyalanur had a population of 6493 with 3406 males and 3087 females. pin code 563102

== See also ==
- Districts of Karnataka
