= Kataripalya =

Kataripalya Katari Palya
- village
- Location in Karnataka, India Kataripalya (India)
- Coordinates: 13°7′55″N 78°7′50″E
- Country: India
- State: Karnataka

Languages
  - Official: Kannada
- Time zone: UTC+5:30 (IST)

Kataripalya is a place in the city of Kolar, Karnataka state of India. The name roughly translates to sword town in Kannada. Kataripalya is home to a historic temple of Gangamma.
