= Huthur =

- village
- Location in Karnataka, India Huthur (India)
- Coordinates: 12.15°N 77.10°E
- Country: India
- State: Karnataka
- District: Kolar district
- Talukas: Kolar

Population (2012)
  - Total: 2,000

Languages
  - Official: Kannada
- Time zone: UTC+5:30 (IST)
- PIN: 08152
- Vehicle registration: 07
- Nearest city: Kolar
- Lok Sabha constituency: Kolar
- Vidhan Sabha constituency: Bangarpete

Huthur is a village in the southern state of Karnataka, India. It is located in the Kolar taluk of Kolar district in Karnataka.

== Demographics ==
As of 2001 India census, Huthur had a population of 2200 with 1200 males and 1000 females.

== See also ==
- Districts of Karnataka
