= Agrahara Somarasanahalli =

- village
- Agrahara Somarasanahalli is in Kolar district
- Interactive map of Agrahara Somarasanahalli
- Coordinates: 13°04′23.84″N 78°15′22.30″E
- Country: India
- State: Karnataka
- District: Kolar
- Talukas: Kolar

Government
  - Body: Village Panchayat

Languages
  - Official: Kannada
- Time zone: UTC+5:30 (IST)
- Nearest city: Kolar
- Civic agency: Village Panchayat

Agrahara Somarasanahalli is a village in the southern state of Karnataka, India.

== Location ==
It is located in the Kolar taluk of Kolar district.

== See also ==
- Kolar
- Districts of Karnataka
