= Mandikal =

Mandikal ಮಂಡಿಕಲ್
- Location within India Location within Karnataka
- Coordinates: 13°36′00″N 77°44′00″E
- Country: India
- State: Karnataka
- Taluk: Chikkaballapura

Area
  - Land: 5.06 km^{2} (1.95 sq mi)
- Elevation: 921 m (3,022 ft)

Population (2011)
  - Total: 910
- Time zone: UTC+5:30
- Area code: 08158

Mandikal (Kannada: ಮಂಡಿಕಲ್) is a village located in present Chikkaballapura taluk, Karnataka, India. As of 2011, it had a population of 910. It is 5.06 km^{2} in area.

== Geography and culture ==
The village is situated about 80 km from Bengaluru and the nearest highway is NH-44. Mandikal is classified as a hobli, and it has a government school with grades from 1st standard to 10th standard. A Government ITI and PU college are also located in the village. Nearby villages are Gundalamandikal, Hosahalli, Bachenahalli, Yatagana halli, Nalapana halli, Jegana halli, Jidamakala halli, Yarabapana halli and Kammaguta halli.

Kannada and Telugu are the two main languages of the settlement.

It lies along the route to the popular trekking destination of Avulabetta hill.

== Economy ==
The main occupation of the village's residents are subsistence farming and herding.
