= Agnihalli =

Coordinates: 13°10′N 78°14′E

- village
- Interactive map of Agnihalli
- Country: India
- State: Karnataka
- District: Kolar
- Talukas: Kolar

Government
  - Body: Village Panchayat

Languages
  - Official: Kannada
- Time zone: UTC+5:30 (IST)
- Nearest city: Kolar
- Civic agency: Village Panchayat

Agnihalli is a village in the southern state of Karnataka, India. It is located in the Kolar taluk of Kolar district in Karnataka.

== See also ==
- Kolar, Karnataka
- Districts of Karnataka
