= Guttahalli, Kolar South =

Guttahalli
- village
- Location in Karnataka, India Guttahalli (India)
- Coordinates: 13.085527133710961°N 78.0356158435682°E
- Country: India
- State: Karnataka
- District: Kolar
- Taluk: Kolar

Government
  - Type: Panchayati raj (India)
  - Body: Gram panchayat

Population
  - Total: 630

Languages
  - Official: Kannada
- Time zone: UTC+5:30 (IST)
- Telephone code: 08152
- ISO 3166 code: IN-KA
- Vehicle registration: KA
- 2011 census code: 621869
- Website: karnataka.gov.in

Guttahalli is a small village in the Kolar Taluk of Kolar district in Karnataka, India. It is situated about 15 kilometres (9.3 mi) from Kolar.

== Demographics ==
According to the 2011 Indian Census, the village consists of 630 people. The town has a literacy rate of 58.57 percent which is higher than Karnataka's average of 75.36 percent.

Total Number of Household : 118
Population	Persons	Males	Females
Total	630	323	307
In the age group 0–6 years	80	41	39
Scheduled Castes (SC)	371	191	180
Scheduled Tribes (ST)	259	132	127
Literates	369	216	153
Illiterate	261	107	154
Total Worker	380	198	182
Main Worker	377	197	180
Main Worker - Cultivator	104	78	26
Main Worker - Agricultural Labourers	152	78	74
Main Worker - Household Industries	3	3	0
Main Worker - Other	118	38	80
Marginal Worker	3	1	2
Marginal Worker - Cultivator	0	0	0
Marginal Worker - Agriculture Labourers	0	0	0
Marginal Worker - Household Industries	0	0	0
Marginal Workers - Other	3	1	2
Marginal Worker (3-6 Months)	3	1	2
Marginal Worker - Cultivator (3-6 Months)	0	0	0
Marginal Worker - Agriculture Labourers (3-6 Months)	0	0	0
Marginal Worker - Household Industries (3-6 Months)	0	0	0
Marginal Worker - Other (3-6 Months)	3	1	2
Marginal Worker (0-3 Months)	0	0	0
Marginal Worker - Cultivator (0-3 Months)	0	0	0
Marginal Worker - Agriculture Labourers (0-3 Months)	0	0	0
Marginal Worker - Household Industries (0-3 Months)	0	0	0
Marginal Worker - Other Workers (0-3 Months)	0	0	0
Non Worker	250	125	125
