= Adepalli =

Coordinates: 13°27′N 78°04′E

- village
- Interactive map of Adepalli
- Country: India
- State: Karnataka
- District: Chikkaballapur
- Talukas: Chintamani

Government
  - Body: Village Panchayat

Languages
  - Official: Kannada
- Time zone: UTC+5:30 (IST)
- Nearest city: Kolar
- Civic agency: Village Panchayat

Adepalli is a village in the southern state of Karnataka, India. It is located in the Chintamani taluk of Chikkaballapura district in Karnataka.

== See also ==
- Kolar
- Districts of Karnataka
