= Adiganapalli =

- village
- Interactive map of Adiganapalli
- Coordinates: 13.7990°N 77.7528°E
- Country: India
- State: Karnataka
- District: Kolar
- Talukas: Bagepalli

Government
  - Body: Village Panchayat

Languages
  - Official: Kannada
- Time zone: UTC+5:30 (IST)
- Nearest city: Kolar
- Civic agency: Village Panchayat

Adiganapalli (Bagepalli) is a village in the southern state of Karnataka, India. It is located in the Bagepalli taluk of Kolar district in Karnataka.

== See also ==
- Kolar
- Districts of Karnataka
