= Rampura, Kolar district =

Village in Karnataka, India

Coordinates: 12°56′34″N 77°56′28″E

Rampura is a village in Malur Taluk, Kolar District, India. It is close to the cities of chikatripathi and hosur.
