= Abbenahalli =

- village
- Location in Karnataka, India Abbenahalli (India)
- Coordinates: 13.046270°N 77.9477300°E
- Country: India
- State: Karnataka
- District: Kolar
- Talukas: Malur

Government
  - Body: Village Panchayat

Languages
  - Official: Kannada
- Time zone: UTC+5:30 (IST)
- Postal code: 563130
- Nearest city: Kolar
- Civic agency: Village Panchayat

Abbenahalli is a village in the southern state of Karnataka, India. It is located in the Malur taluk of Kolar district in Karnataka.

== See also ==
- Kolar
- Districts of Karnataka
