= Hossur =

Coordinates: 13°33′N 75°15′E

- village
- Interactive map of Hossur
- Country: India
- State: Karnataka
- District: Chikkaballapur
- Talukas: Gauribidanur

Population (2001)
  - Total: 6,496

Languages
  - Official: Kannada
- Time zone: UTC+5:30 (IST)
- PIN: 561210

Hossur is a village in the southern state of Karnataka, India. It is located in the Gauribidanur taluk of Chikkaballapur district in Karnataka.

== Mysore Gazette-1890 ==
Hosur. — A large village in the Gauribidanur taluk, 6 miles south-west of the kasba. Population 2,574. A fair held on Saturday is attended by 500 people. Under the name of Hosavidu, the new camp or residence, it was for a time occupied by the Hoysala king Ballala III, who may have been its founder, and may have named it with reference to Halebidu, his old residence or capital of Dorasamudra, which had been destroyed by the Musalmans. As Hosapattana, it apparently formed in 1355 one of the boundary towns.

== Demographics ==
As of 2001 India census, Hossur had a population of 6496 with 3366 males and 3130 females.

== Notable people ==
- Hosur Narasimhaiah, physicist and educator

== See also ==
- Chikkaballapur
- Districts of Karnataka
