= Ankathatti =

- village
- Country: India
- State: Karnataka

Government
  - Body: Gram panchayat

Languages
  - Official: Kannada
- Time zone: UTC+5:30 (IST)
- ISO 3166 code: IN-KA
- Vehicle registration: KA
- Website: karnataka.gov.in

Ankathatti is a village in the state of Karnataka, India, situated 15 km away from Kolar. The village has a population of about 900, with 300 houses. Ankathatti is known for its religious culture, having a 4 ft (1.2 m) height Uthsava Murti, as well as its high production of silk and milk.
