= Maasti =

Maasti is a village in India, located in the state of Karnataka, within the administrative divisions of Taluk of Malur in the district of Kolar. It belongs to the Bangalore Division and is located 38 km south of the district headquarters in Kolar, 18 km from Malur, 53 km from the state capital Bangalore. The Maasti pin code is 563139 and the postal head office is Maasti. Kannada is the local language.

== Transport ==
=== Rail ===
The nearest railway stations are at Byatrayanhalli (16 km), Malur (16 km), Tyakal (17 km) and Kamasamudram (24 km).

=== Road ===
Roads connect to Kolar and Bangarapet.

=== Air ===
The nearest airport is Bengaluru International Airport (70 km).
