= Guttahalli, Kolar West =

Guttahalli
- village
- Location in Karnataka, India Guttahalli (India)
- Coordinates: 13.164994539465086°N 77.95884242321284°E
- Country: India
- State: Karnataka
- District: Kolar
- Taluk: Kolar

Government
  - Type: Panchayati raj (India)
  - Body: Gram panchayat

Population
  - Total: 1,090

Languages
  - Official: Kannada
- Time zone: UTC+5:30 (IST)
- Telephone code: 08152
- ISO 3166 code: IN-KA
- Vehicle registration: KA
- 2011 census code: 621808
- Website: karnataka.gov.in

Guttahalli is a small village in the Kolar Taluk of Kolar district in Karnataka, India. It is situated about 25 kilometers from Kolar.

== Demographics ==
According to the 2011 Indian Census, the village consists of 1,090 people. The town has a literacy rate of 55.05 percent which is lower than Karnataka's average of 75.36 percent.

Total Number of Household : 220
Population	Persons	Males	Females
Total	1,090	556	534
In the age group 0–6 years	138	65	73
Scheduled Castes (SC)	433	213	220
Scheduled Tribes (ST)	20	8	12
Literates	600	357	243
Illiterate	490	199	291
Total Worker	673	348	325
Main Worker	661	344	317
Main Worker - Cultivator	317	212	105
Main Worker - Agricultural Labourers	283	84	199
Main Worker - Household Industries	0	0	0
Main Worker - Other	61	48	13
Marginal Worker	12	4	8
Marginal Worker - Cultivator	0	0	0
Marginal Worker - Agriculture Labourers	9	3	6
Marginal Worker - Household Industries	0	0	0
Marginal Workers - Other	3	1	2
Marginal Worker (3-6 Months)	10	2	8
Marginal Worker - Cultivator (3-6 Months)	0	0	0
Marginal Worker - Agriculture Labourers (3-6 Months)	7	1	6
Marginal Worker - Household Industries (3-6 Months)	0	0	0
Marginal Worker - Other (3-6 Months)	3	1	2
Marginal Worker (0-3 Months)	2	2	0
Marginal Worker - Cultivator (0-3 Months)	0	0	0
Marginal Worker - Agriculture Labourers (0-3 Months)	2	2	0
Marginal Worker - Household Industries (0-3 Months)	0	0	0
Marginal Worker - Other Workers (0-3 Months)	0	0	0
Non Worker	417	208	209
