= Ajjapalli, Kolar =

Ajjapanahalli
- village
- Ajjapanahalli, Kolar is in Kolar district
- Country: India
- State: Karnataka
- District: Kolar
- Talukas: Kolar

Government
  - Body: Village Panchayat

Languages
  - Official: Kannada
- Time zone: UTC+5:30 (IST)
- Nearest city: Kolar
- Civic agency: Village Panchayat

Ajjapanahalli, Kolar is a village in the southern state of Karnataka, India. It is located in the Kolar taluk of Kolar district in Karnataka. It connects to Chennai-Bangalore National Highway (Mulbagal Road) and the restaurants like Polar bear, Maiyas, Domino's Pizza, Adigas restaurant are present here. Ajjapanahalli is almost 3-4 kilometres away from R L Jalappa Hospital and SDUMC, Tamaka, Kolar.

== See also ==
- Kolar, Karnataka
- Districts of Karnataka
