= Jagadenahalli =

Village in Karnataka, India

Jagadenahalli is a village in Malur Taluk, Kolar district, Karnataka, India.

Lord Thimmaraya swammy along with goddess Sridevi and Bhudevi temple is located in Jagadenahalli. Lord Venkateswara is worshiped in the name of Thimmaraya swammy.

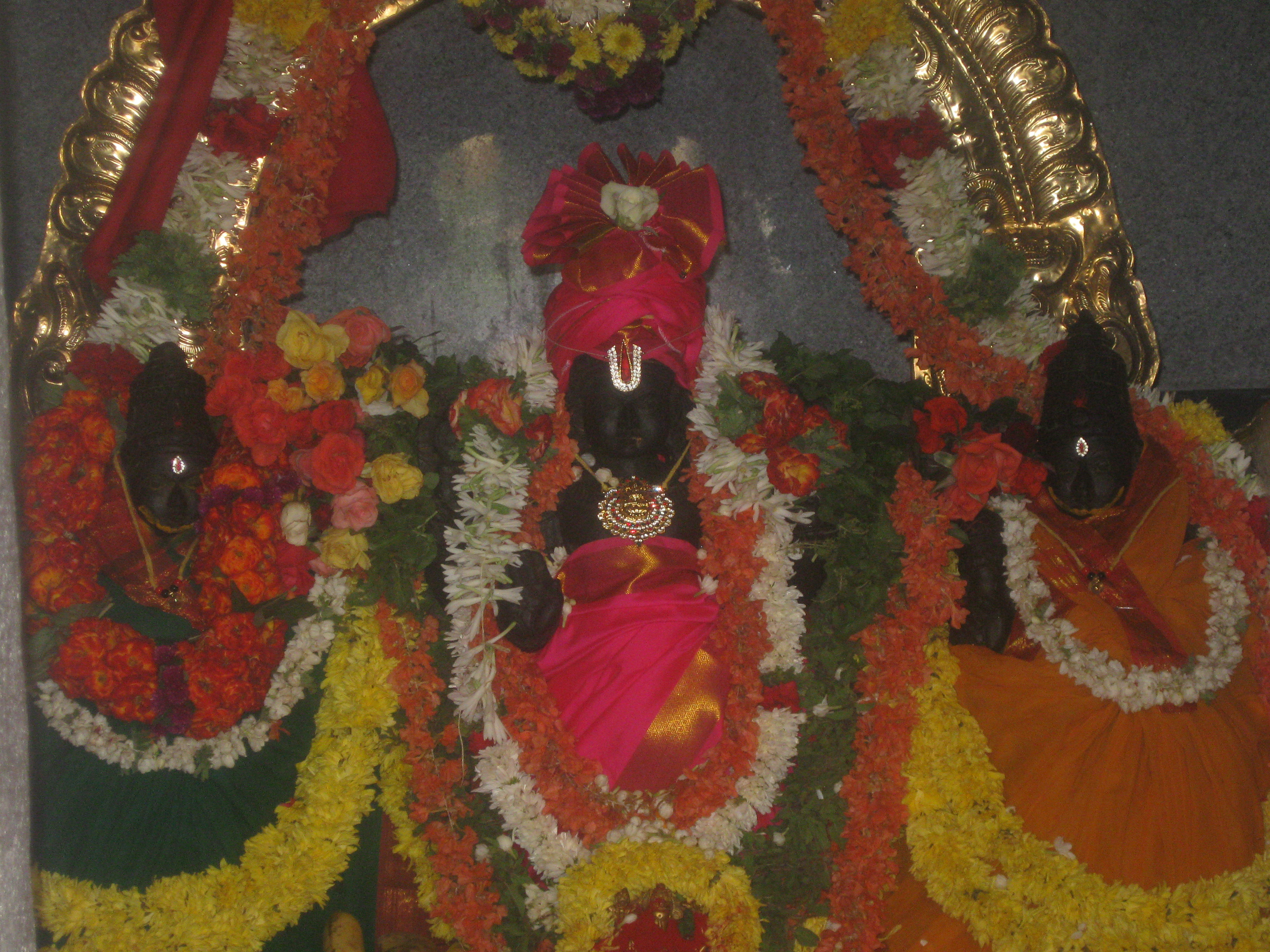
Lord Thimmaraya swammy along with goddess Sridevi and Bhudevi

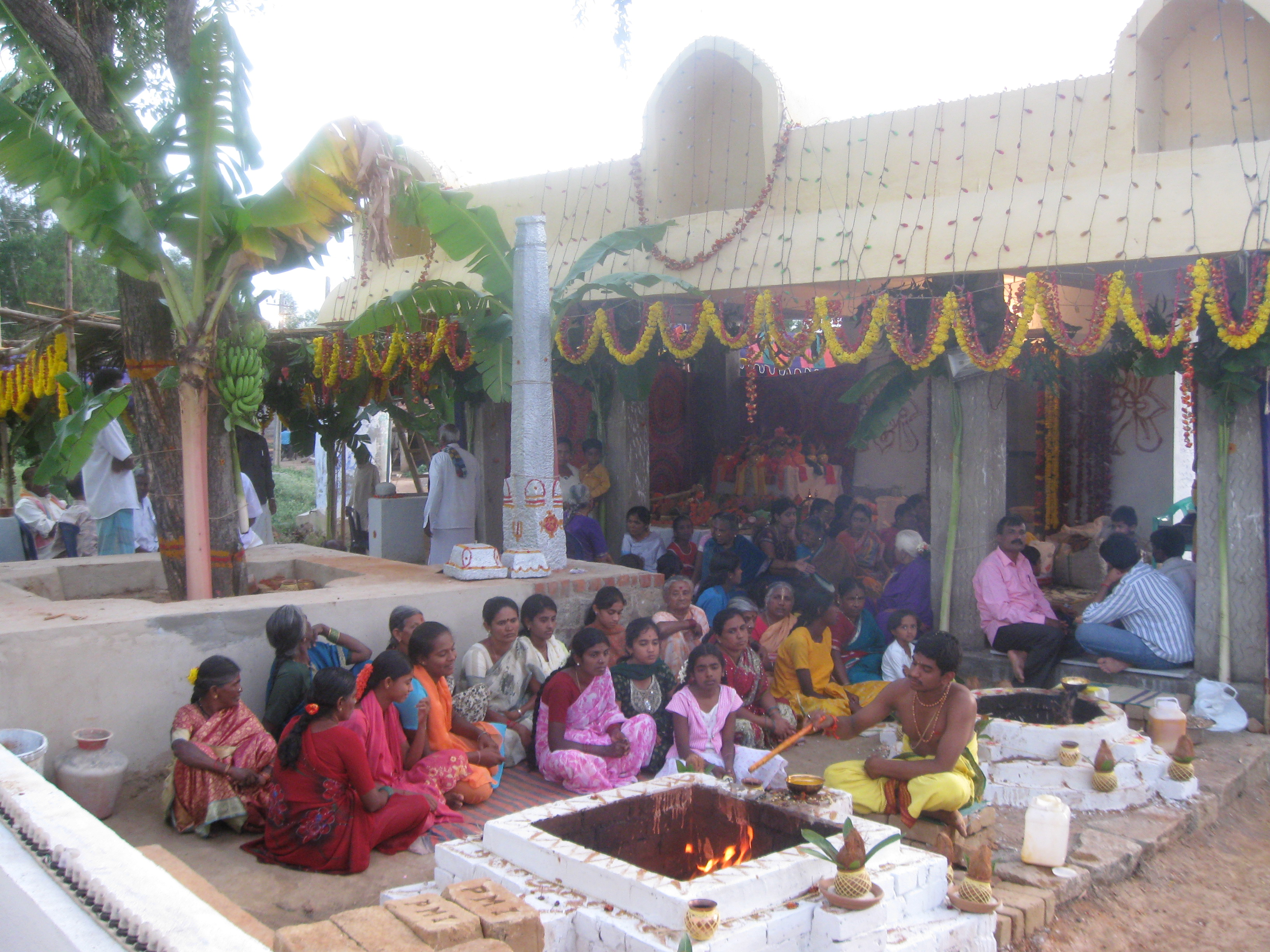
Lord Sri Thimmaraya swamy temple Located in Jagadenahalli

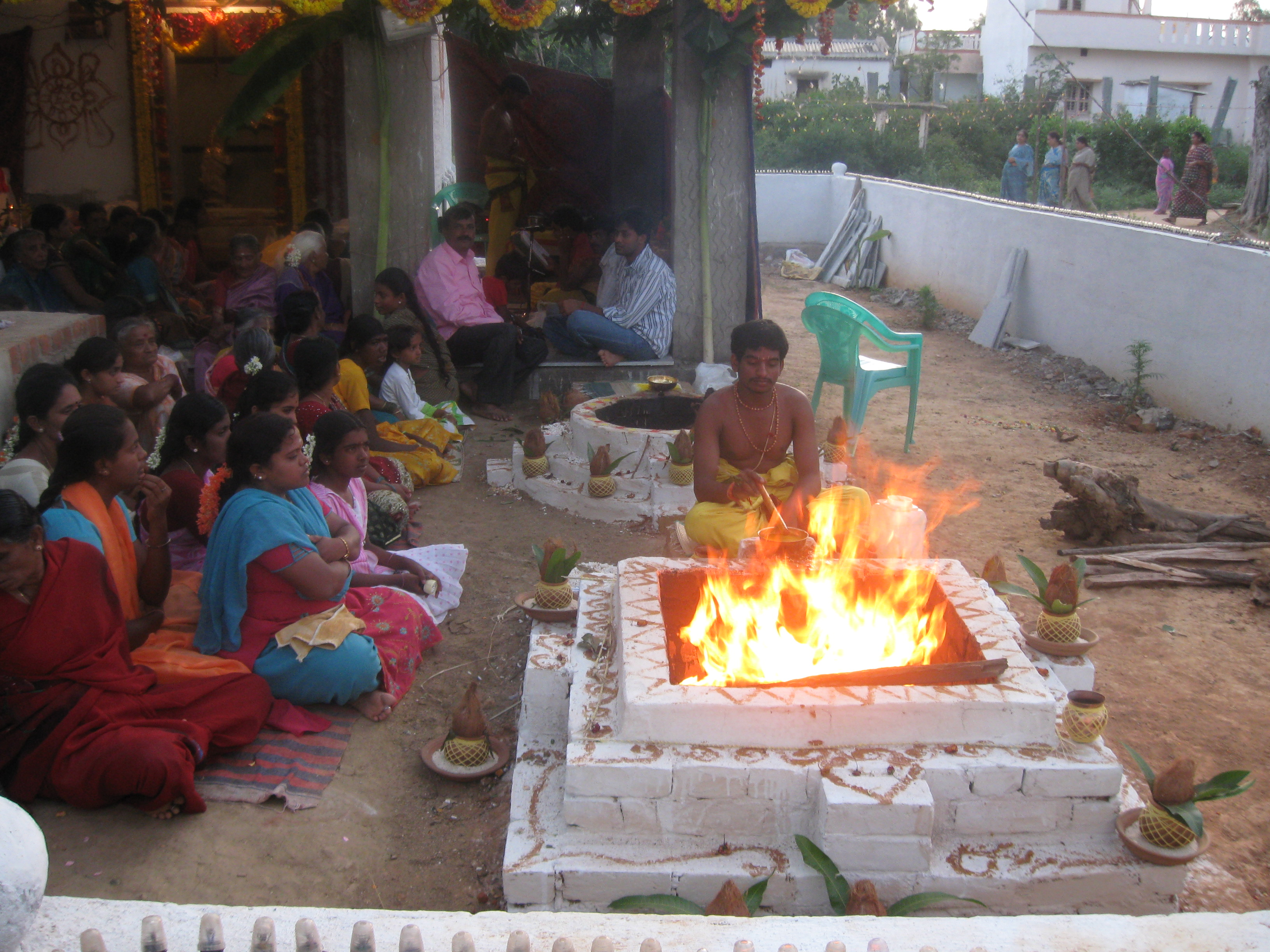
Homa during Sri Thimmaraya swamy Pratishthapana
