= Hebbani =

Village in Karnataka, India

Coordinates: 13.28289°N 78.56302°E

Hebbani is a village on the Nangali to Punganur road in Kolar district, Karnataka State, India.
