= Gattahalli =

Village in Kolar, Karnataka, India

Coordinates: 13°31′N 77°10′E

Gattahalli is a small village in the Kolar district of Karnataka state in India. It is situated about 21 kilometers from Kolar, and the nearest town to this village is Srinivaspur about 10 km and Mulbagal about 15 km.
