= Jogalakasti =

Jogalakasti is a village in the Mulbagal taluk of the Kolar district of Karnataka, India. As of the 2011 census of India, it had a population of 872 across 168 households
