= Marandahalli, Mulbagal =

Village in Karnataka, India

Marandahalli is a small village which lies along the Bangalore–Tirupati national highway, in Kolar district near Mulbagal. Marandahalli is a small village with approximately 500 houses, a government school, a temple of Grama Devate Gangamma and a temple of Sri Anjaneya Swamy.

== Sri Anjaneya Swamy Temple ==
Sri Anjaneya Swamy Temple in the village traces its history back 400 years. When Mughals attacked Vijayanagar Empire ruled by Sri Krishnadevaraya, people sought safer destinations; then the Raja of Punganur provided shelter at present-day Marandahalli.

The temple was constructed by Brahmin scholars with the Idols of 'Sri Anjaneya Swamy, Sri Varadarajaru with Sridevi and Bhoodevi'. From then the temple has been renovated twice, the second time in 2000.

Along with the existing idols, Lord Shiva, Parvati and Ganapati idols were also installed at the time of renovation.

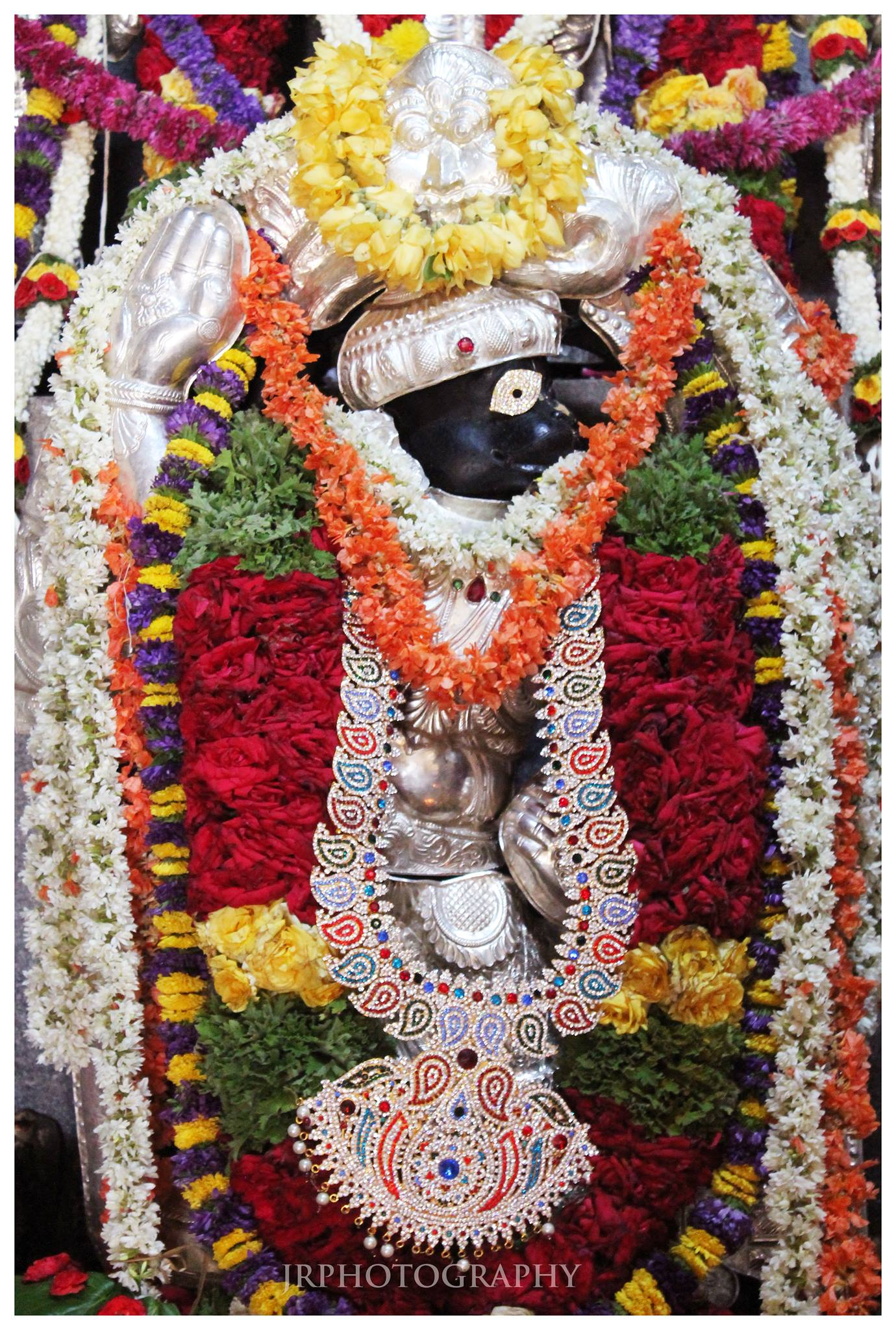

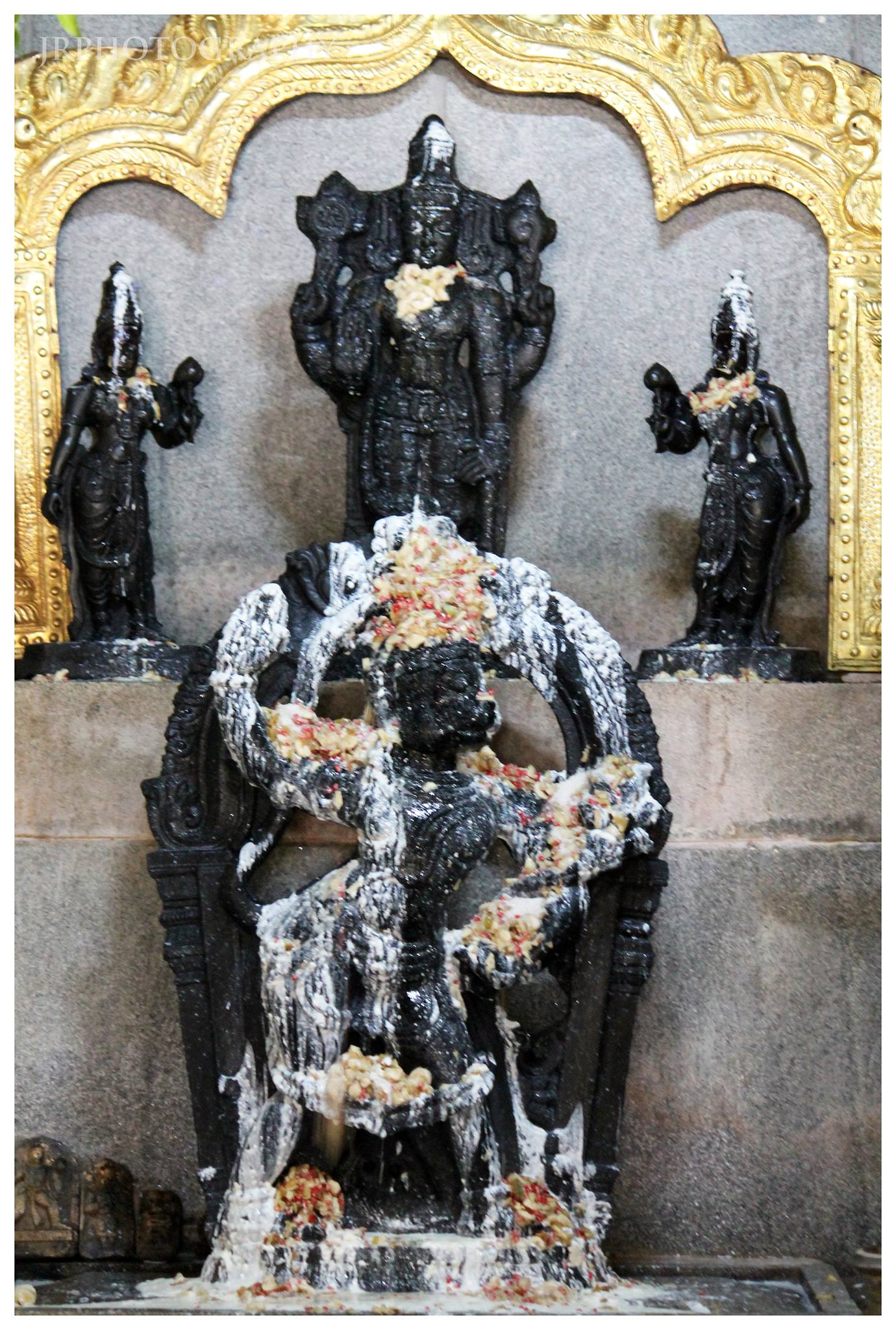

=== Annual Temple Functions ===
Throughout the year many festivals celebrated in the temple.

1.Madhwa Navami 2.Maha Shivaratri 3.SriRama Navami 4.Varshikotsava (Kalyanatosava, Rathotsava and Shayanotsava) 5.Vijaya Dashami 6.Dhatri Hawana 7.Hanuma Jayanti

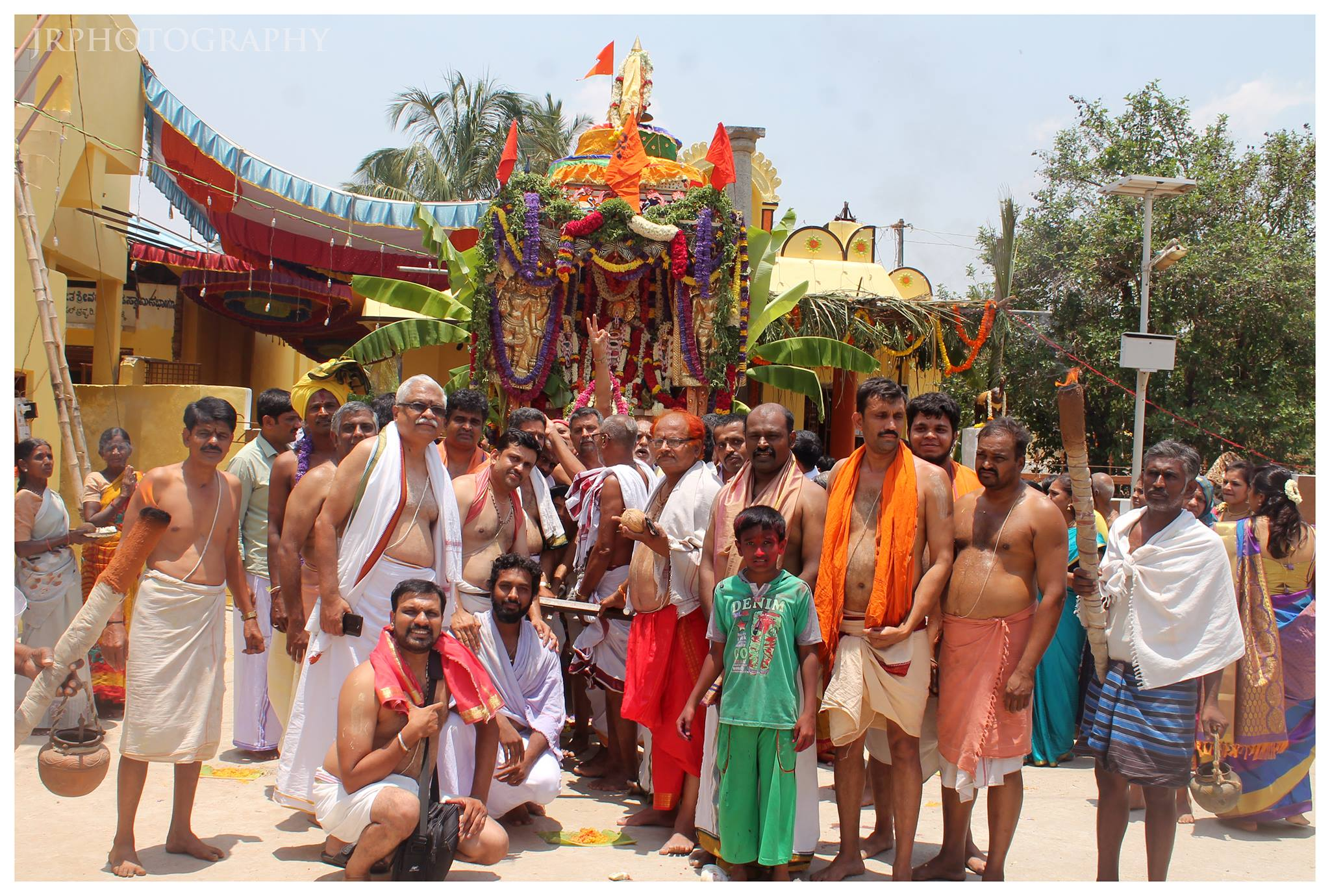

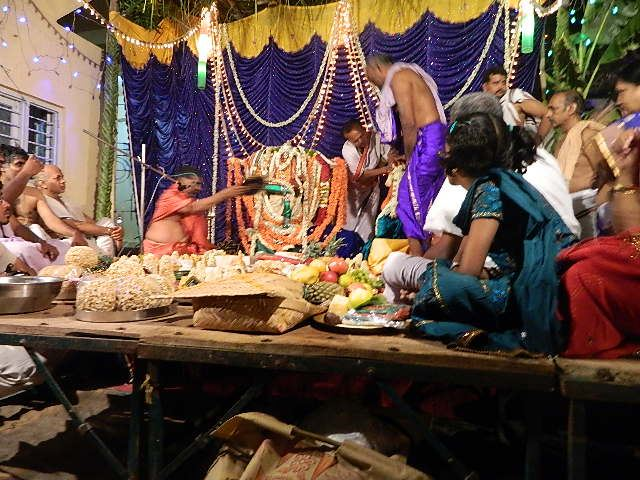

== How To Reach ==
- From Bangalore the Temple located at a distance of 100km on Bangalore-Tirupati NH. After Mulabagilu it's around 4-5 kms. After Narasimhateertha proceed further on Tirupati Highway for about 1 km, on the left you can see the sign board "Abhayaprada Anjaneya Swamy Temple". Take a left turn just after the Sign board and reach the Temple after 2km.

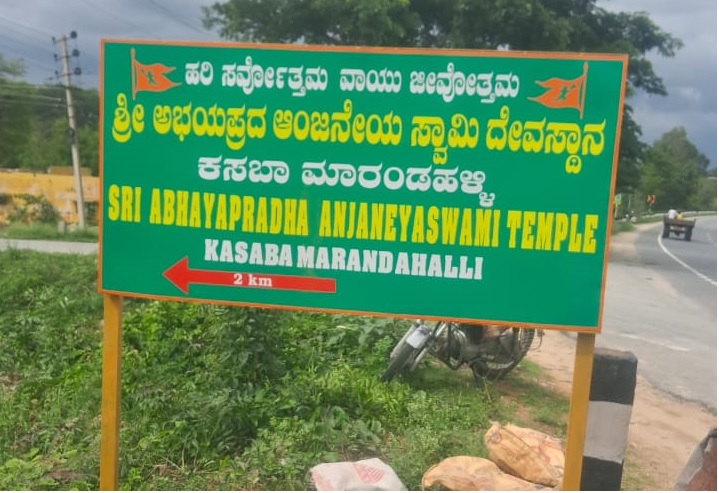
