= Marasanapalli =

Marasanapalli Marasanapalli
- Village
- Location in Karnataka, India Marasanapalli (India)
- Coordinates: 13.568572°N 78.222613°E
- Country: India
- State: Karnataka
- District: Kolar District

Population (2011)
  - Total: 1,700

Languages
  - Official: Kannada
- Time zone: UTC+5:30 (IST)
- PIN: 563135
- Vehicle registration: KA07

Marasanapalli is a small village in Srinivasapur taluk of Kolar district in Karnataka, India.
