= Achampally =

Coordinates: 13.0523°N 78.4101°E

Achampally (Village ID 621714) is a village situated at Achampally, Gangadhara mandel, Karimnagar district, Telangana, India. The major economic activity is agriculture. Other economic activities include sericulture, dairy, and vegetable farming. According to the 2011 census it has a population of 1341 living in 280 households.

About 120 families live there. About 1,000 male and female people reside in the village and the literacy rate is about 65%. The educated people from the village serve as teachers, advocates, engineers and government employees.

== Temples ==
- Shri Laxmi Narayana Swamy Temple, Shri Teegala Venkateshwara Swamy Temple, Shri Hanuman Temple is the main temples worshipped in Village.
- in 2021, Gangamma Temple is being built beside the Flood Canal in the centre of the village. Villagers perform an annual festival for the god gangamma
- పోచమ్మ గుడి
