= Padakasti =

- Village
- Interactive map of Padakasti
- Coordinates: 13°05′58″N 78°24′19″E
- Country: India
- State: Karnataka
- District: Kolar
- Taluk: Mulbagal

Area
  - Total: 1.29 km^{2} (0.50 sq mi)

Population (2011)
  - Total: 544
  - Density: 422/km^{2} (1,090/sq mi)

Languages
  - Official: Kannada
- Time zone: UTC+5:30 (IST)
- PIN: 563136

Padakasti is a small revenue village in Mulbagal taluk, Kolar district, Karnataka. It covers an area of 1.29 km^{2} (0.50 sq mi) and had a population of 544 as of the 2011 Indian Census.
