= Kanchala =

Coordinates: 12.8574407°N 78.0346303°E

Kanchala is a village of Kolar district in the southern Indian state of Karnataka. It is located about 50 km east of the state capital, Bangalore, just north of the Tamil Nadu border. In 2001, its population was 464 inhabitants, with 98 households, 233 males and 231 females.

In Kanchala village, agriculture is the main occupation. Finger millet (ragi) and vegetables are extensively grown here. Ragi mudde, also colloquially simply referred to as either 'Mudde' or 'HiTTu'; is a wholesome meal in Kanchala. It is mainly popular with the rural folk of Karnataka.

Kanchala has 3 main temples. one is Mariyamman temple, known for Uru Devaru. another one is Gopalaswamy temple, it is near Mariyamma Temple, and mainly known for Srikrishna temple. Another one is Gangamma Temple, And there are a few small temples like Ganesh temple, Kadumalleshwara temple, Muneshwara temples. The main temple Shanimahathma is also quite famous.

Kanchala has school there almost 40 to 50 students passes out from 5th standard which is located near to the bus stop.

Kanchala is also known for people who are interested in the jalikattu bull festivals, here few of the people still raise their own bulls and prepare for jalikattu festival.

Masti Venkatesha Iyengar, a well-known writer in Kannada language and the fourth among Kannada writers to be honored with the Jnanpith Award, the highest literary honour conferred in India, was born at Hosahalli.
