= Abbihalli =

Coordinates: 13°03′N 77°57′E

Abbihalli appali
- village
- Nickname: abbenahalli
- Interactive map of Abbihalli
- Country: India
- State: Karnataka
- District: Kolar
- Founder: bajantri pedanna
- Talukas: Mulbagal

Government
  - Body: Village Panchayat

Languages
  - Telugu, Kannada, Urdu: Kannada
- Time zone: UTC+5:30 (IST)
- Postal code: 563136
- Mulabagilu: Kolar
- Civic agency: Village Panchayat

Abbihalli is a village in the southern state of Karnataka, India. It is located in the Mulbagal taluk of Kolar district in Karnataka.

== See also ==
- Kolar
- Districts of Karnataka
