= Kalkunte =

- Village
- Location in Karnataka, India Kalkunte (India)
- Coordinates: 12.5554°N 77.5026°E
- Country: India
- State: Karnataka
- District: Kolar

Government
  - Body: Gram panchayat

Languages
  - Official: Kannada
- Time zone: UTC+5:30 (IST)
- PIN: 560067
- ISO 3166 code: IN-KA
- Vehicle registration: KA
- Website: karnataka.gov.in

Kalkunte is a village about 35 kilometres (22 mi) from Bangalore in Karnataka, India.
