= Chelur =

- Taluk
- Location in Karnataka, India Chelur (India)
- Coordinates: 13.7091300°N 78.0972200°E
- Country: India
- State: Karnataka
- District: Chikkaballapur

Population (2001)
  - Total: 5,100

Languages
  - Official: Kannada
- Time zone: UTC+5:30 (IST)

Chelur is a taluk and town in the southern state of Karnataka, India. It is located in the Chikkaballapur district in Karnataka.

== Demographics ==
As of 2001 India census, Chelur had a population of 5100 with 2611 males and 2489 females.

== See also ==
- Chikkaballapura
- Districts of Karnataka
- Chikkaballapura district
