= Manchenahalli =

- town
- Location in Karnataka, India Manchenahalli (India)
- Coordinates: 13°30′00″N 77°36′10″E
- Country: India
- State: Karnataka
- District: Chikkaballapur
- Talukas: Manchenahalli

Government
  - Type: Panchayati raj (India)
  - Body: Manchenahalli Gram Panchayat

Area
  - Total: 6.63 km^{2} (2.56 sq mi)
- Elevation: 764 m (2,507 ft)

Population (2011)
  - Total: 7,775
  - Density: 1,170/km^{2} (3,040/sq mi)

Languages
  - Official: Kannada
- Time zone: UTC+5:30 (IST)
- PIN: 561211
- Sex Ratio: 969 female / 1000 male
- Literacy Rate: 73.48%

Manchenahalli is a town in the southern state of Karnataka, India. On 31 October 2019, the chief minister of Karnataka state, Shree B S Yediyurappa promoted Manchenahalli as Taluk. It is located in the Gauribidanur taluk of Chikkaballapur district in Karnataka. It is located 14 km from the town of Gowribidanur and 10 km from Muddenahalli-Kanivenarayanapura. The town houses a Jain shrine called Manchenahalli Jain Temple devoted to Shri Kodi Brahmadeva, Also a dam is attached to this temple. A tourist hub is located in nearby Minikanagurki. Also it's near to Srinivasagara

== Demographics ==
As of 2001 India census, Manchenahalli has a population of 7205 with 3657 males and 3548 females.

== See also ==
- Chickballapur
- Districts of Karnataka
