= Uttanur =

Village in Karnataka, India

Coordinates: 13°12′26″N 78°17′04″E

Uthanur or Uttanur is a village in the Mulbagal Tehsil region of the Kolar district in the southern Indian state of Karnataka. It is located approximately 85 km east of Bangalore, the state capital. In 2011, the population was 1,604, consisting of 817 males and 787 females.

== Divisions ==
- Alaganahalli
- Banahalli
- Doddagurki
- K.G. Lakshmisagara
- Kenchanahalli
- Nagareddyhalli
- Nallandahalli
- Pombarahalli
- Shivanarahalli
- Uthanur
- Vaniganahalli
- Yanadigollahalli
- Mallasandra
- Maralamedu
- Ramapura

== Infrastructure ==
Uttanur is located 6 km from NH-4, a four-lane road connecting Bangalore to Nangali in the Mulbagal Kolar district. Major roads, totaling approximately 354 km, provide further connectivity to the area.
