= Sidlaghatta =

Sidlaghatta Shidlaghatta
- Town
- Nickname: Silk City
- Location in Karnataka, India
- Coordinates: 13.39°N 77.86°E
- Country: India
- State: Karnataka
- District: Chikkaballapur
- Elevation: 878 m (2,881 ft)

Population (2011)
  - Total: 51,159

Languages
- Time zone: UTC+5:30 (IST)
- PIN: 562105
- Telephone code: 08158
- Vehicle registration: KA-40
- Website: www.sidlaghatta.com

Shidlaghatta is a town in the Chikkaballapur district in the Indian state of Karnataka. It is known for raw silk. All the taluk administration lies with the taluk panchayat for the implementation of developmental schemes and their progress.

== Geography ==
Sidlaghatta has an average elevation of 878 metres (2880 feet). 1.5 km south to north

== Demographics ==
As of 2001, Sidlaghatta had a population of 41,105. Males constitute 52% of the population and females 48%. Sidlaghatta has an average literacy rate of 62%, higher than the national average of 59.5%: male literacy is 67%, and female literacy is 56%. In Sidlaghatta, 14% of the population is under 6 years of age.

== Notable residents ==
N. R. Narayana Murty
