= Bhagyanagar, Chikkaballapura =

Bagepalli Bagyanagara
- Town
- Location in Karnataka, India
- Coordinates: 13.78°N 77.79°E
- Country: India
- State: Karnataka
- District: Chikballapur district

Government
  - Type: Municipal Council
  - Body: Bagepalli Town Municipal Council
- Elevation: 707 m (2,320 ft)

Population (2011)
  - Total: 27,011

Languages
  - Official: Kannada
- Time zone: UTC+05:30 (IST)
- PIN: 561207
- Vehicle registration: KA-40
- Website: http://www.bagepallitown.mrc.gov.in

Bagepalli is a taluk in the Chikkaballapura district of Karnataka, India. It is situated 100 km north of Bengaluru on the Bangalore–Hyderabad National Highway. The region lies just below the southern border of Rayalaseema in Andhra Pradesh, South India. It is a semi-arid and drought-prone area, receiving 535 mm of erratic, spatially uneven rainfall.

== Geography ==
Bagepalli is located at 13.78°N 77.79°E. It has an average elevation of 707 metres (2319 ft).

The region is a semi arid drought prone one with low, erratic and spatial rainfall. The dust brown rocky terrain is severely undulating, with small hill ranges and outcrops that stud the topography. There is no mineral wealth and only a very thin and fragile soil cover.

An adverse land:person ratio creates a strong thirst for cultivable land since less than one-half of the total land is fit for cultivation, with the remaining taken over by the hills and rocky fields. Hardly 5% of the cropped lands are irrigated by an age old network of rain-fed tanks (small lakes), each irrigating 2 to 10 hectares of wet land. The low water table is tapped through bore-wells drilled to more than 100 meters depth. Even these dry up in the summer months, from April to September every year, when temperatures rise to a dry heat of 38 °C.

The average rainfall is 535 mm a year and this is, moreover, erratic and spatial. As a result there is only 1 rain-fed crop a year, whose stand is from late June till December. Groundnuts are grown on these dry lands, inter-cropped with red gram, cowpea, field beans, green gram, jowar, maize and castor on the field bunds. Irrigated groundnut, mulberry, onions and sunflower are the common bore-well irrigated crops. Ragi (golden millet) and a coarse variety of paddy are cultivated under irrigation tanks. Every fifth or sixth year is a drought, followed by near famine conditions.

== Demographics ==
As of 2001 India census, Bagepalli had a population of 1,69,689. Males constitute 50.7% of the population and females 49.3%. Bagepalli has an average literacy rate of 63%, higher than the national average of 59.5%; with 56% of the males and 44% of females literate. 12% of the population is under 7 years of age. Bagepalli is one of the only places in Karnataka to have a majority Telugu speaking population.

Languages of Bagepalli Taluk (2011 census)
1. Telugu (55.3%)
2. Kannada (32.3%)
3. Urdu (9.29%)
4. Hindi (2.78%)
5. Others (0.42%)
