= Chikkaballapura district =

- District of Karnataka
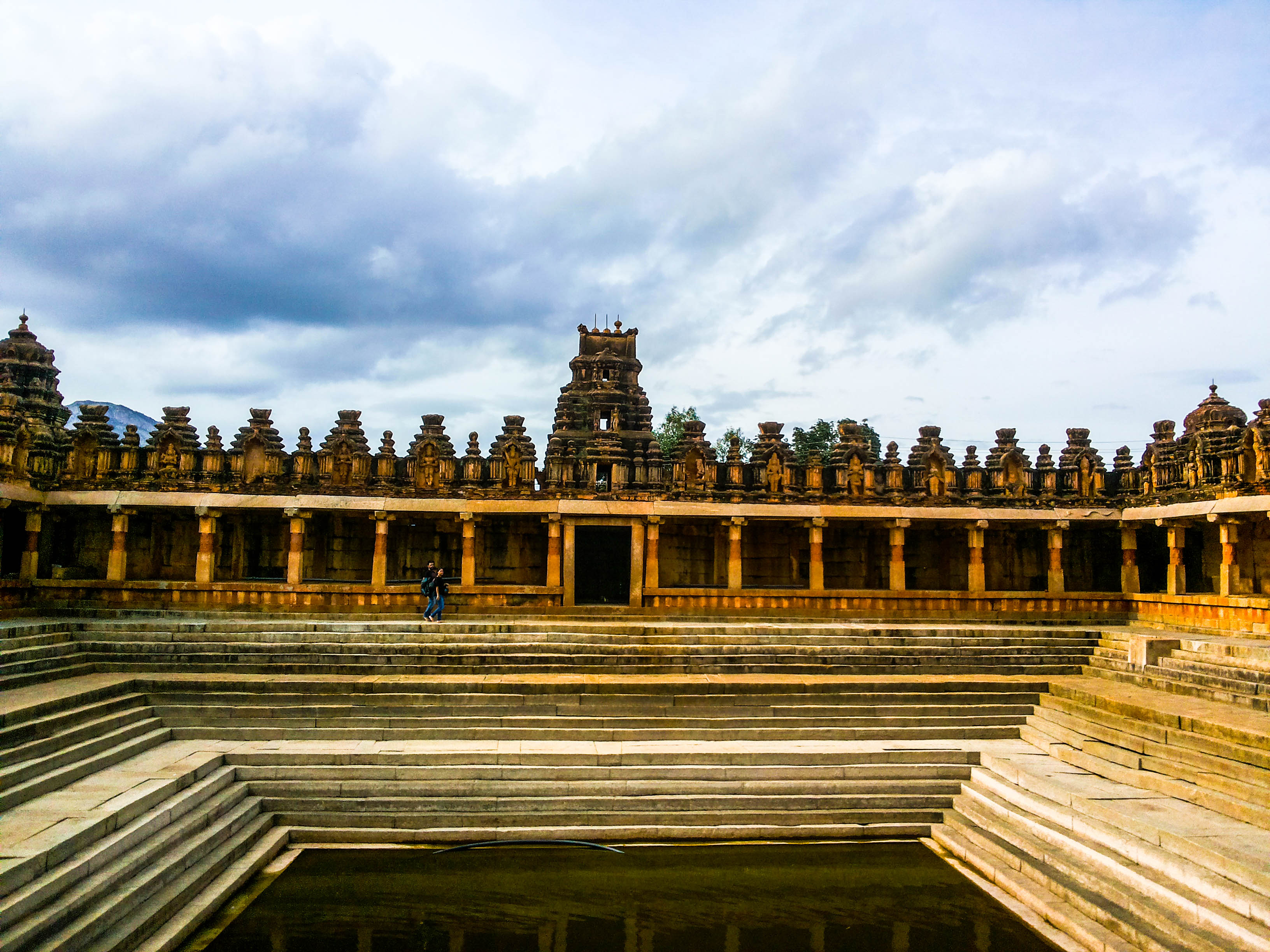
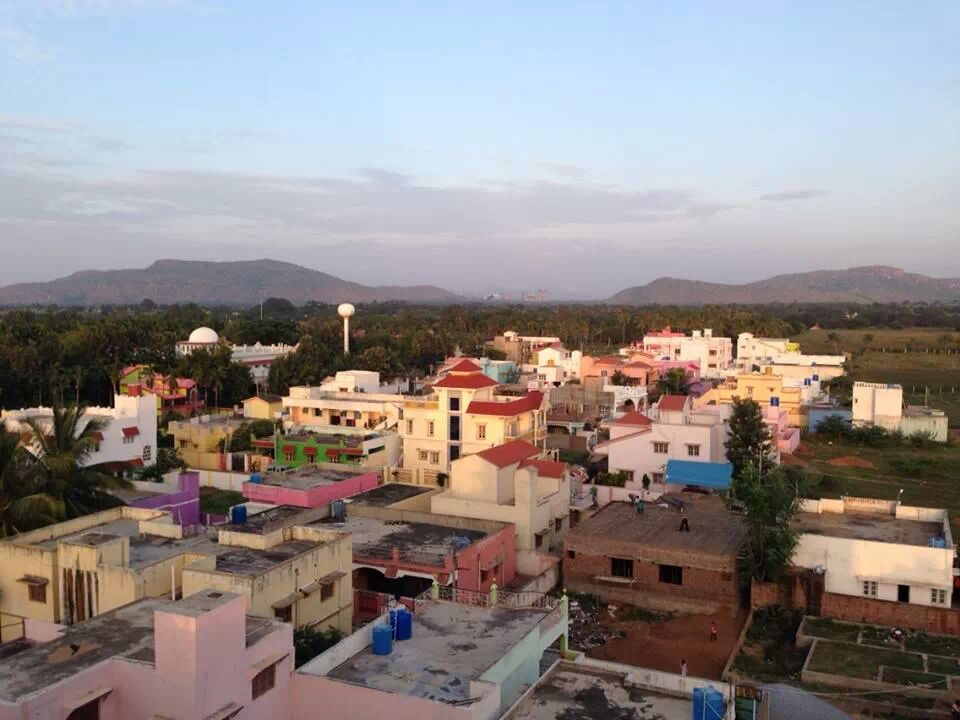
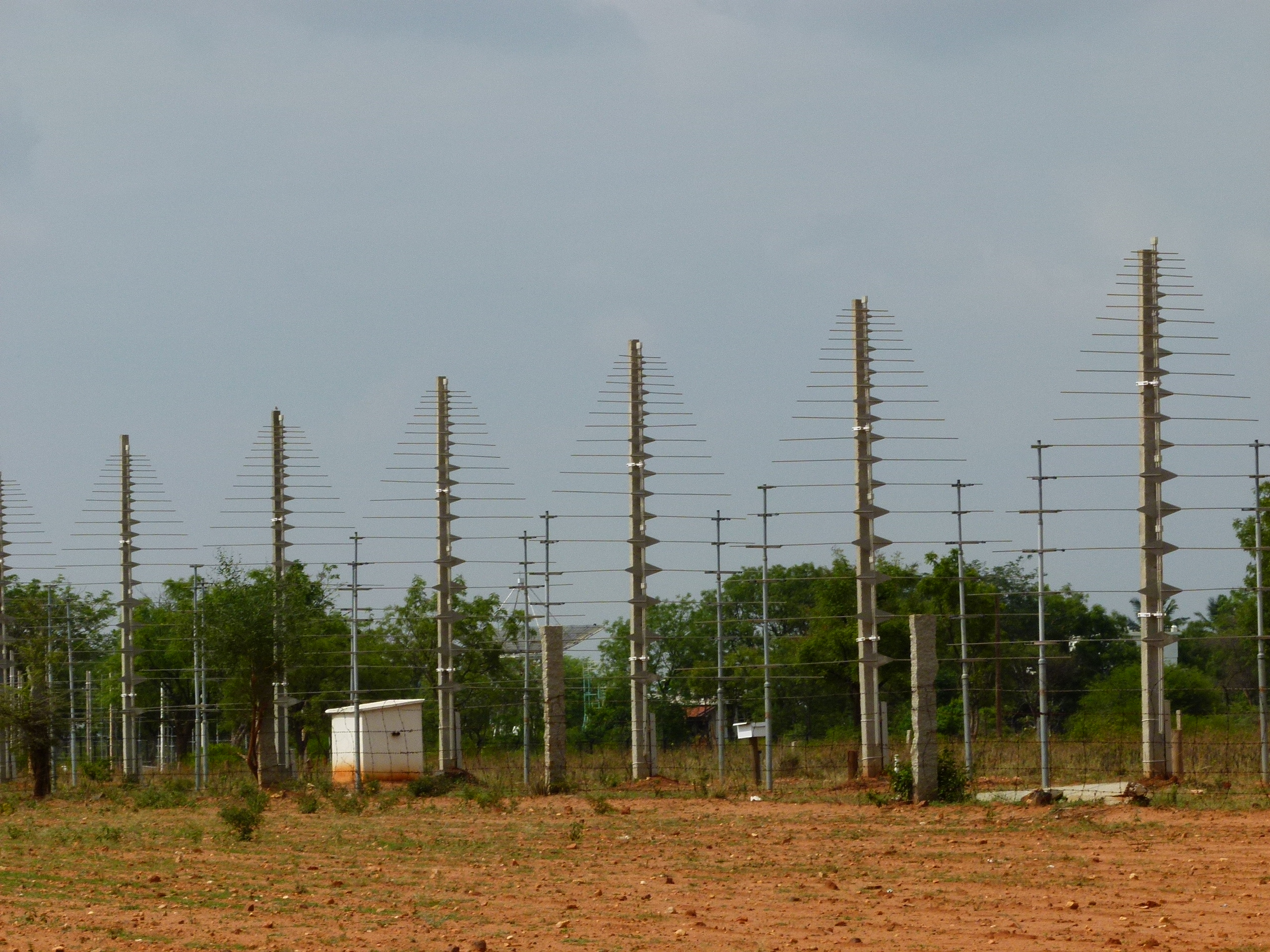
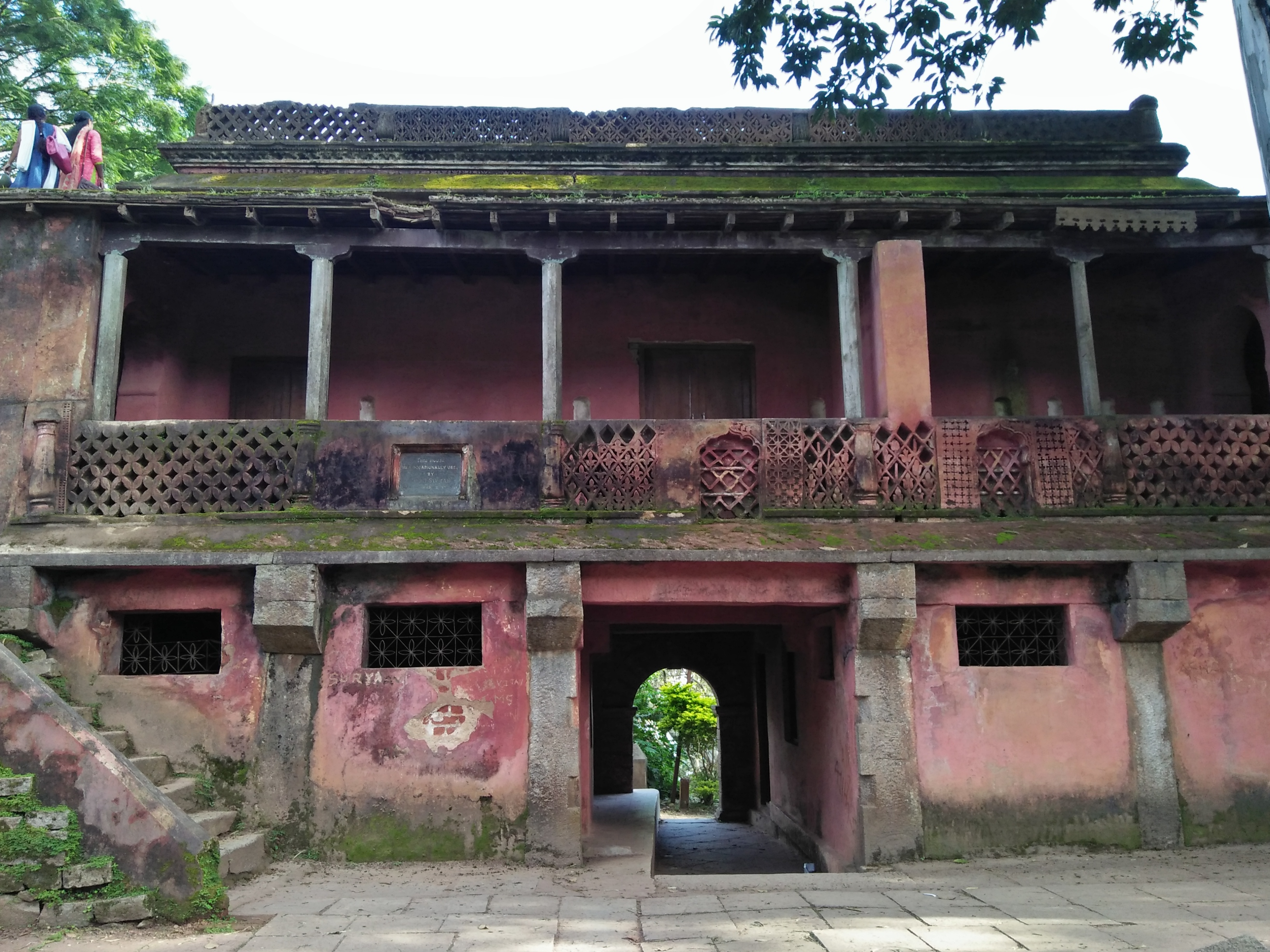
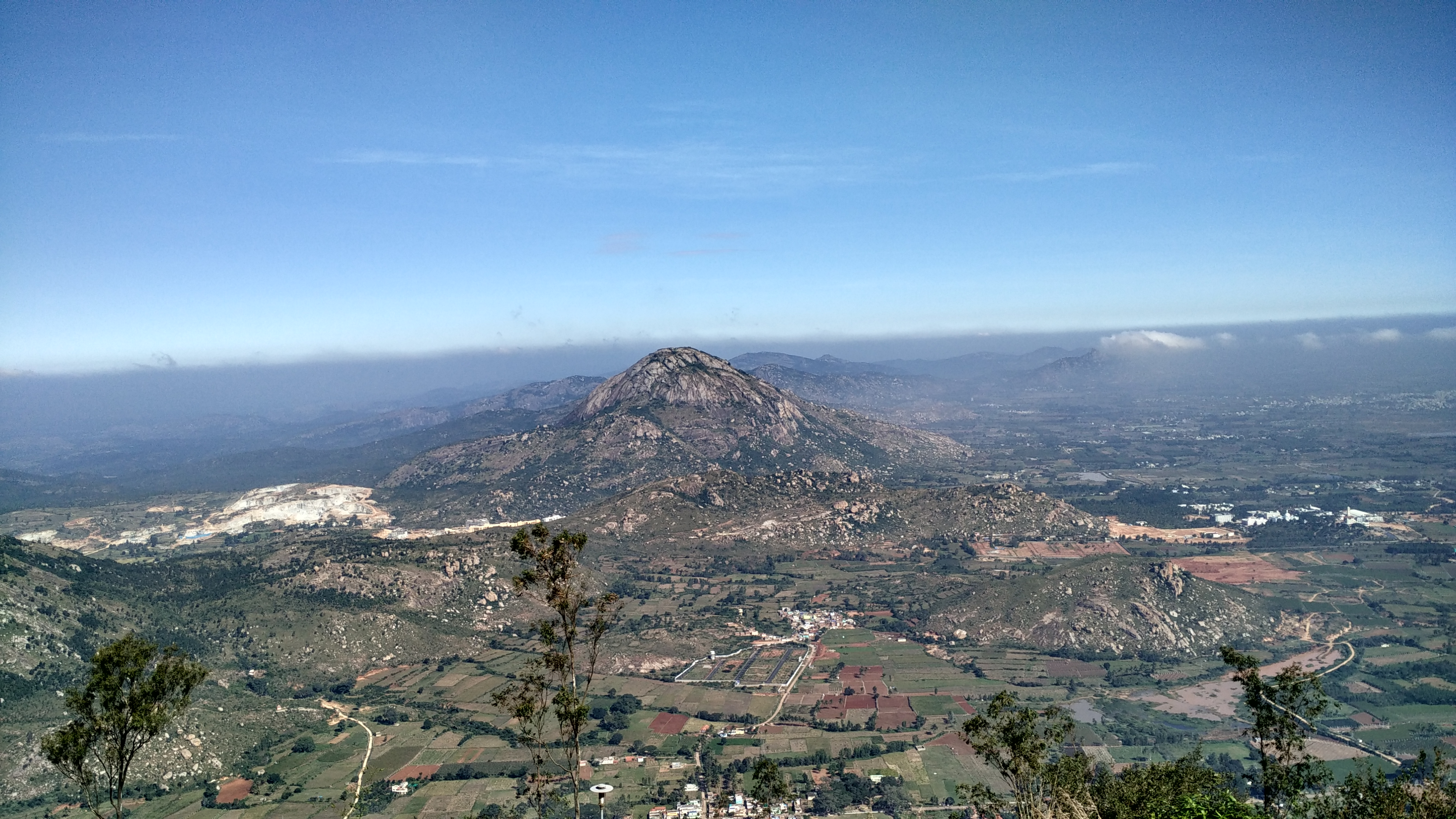
- Clockwise from top-left: Bhoganandishwara Temple, Alipur, Tipu Lodge, Nandi Hills, Gauribidanur Radio Observatory
- Interactive map of Chikkaballapura district
- Coordinates: 13.43°N 77.72°E
- Country: India
- State: Karnataka
- Chikkaballapura district: 10 November 2007
- Headquarters: Chikkaballapur

Government
  - District Collector: Ravindra P N (IAS)
  - CEO of Zilla Panchayat: Naveen Bhat Y, (IAS)
  - District in-charge minister: M. C. Sudhakar
  - Superintendent of Police: Kushal Chouksey I.P.S.

Area
  - Total: 4,244 km^{2} (1,639 sq mi)

Population (2011)
  - Total: 1,255,104
  - Density: 298/km^{2} (770/sq mi)

Languages
  - Official: Kannada
- Time zone: UTC+5:30 (IST)
- PIN: 562 101
- Telephone code: 08156
- Vehicle registration: Chikkaballapur KA-40 Chintamani KA-67
- Sex Ratio: 972 female / 1000 male
- Literacy Rate: 69.76%
- Website: http://www.chikkaballapur.nic.in

Chikkaballāpura district is a district in the southern Indian state of Karnataka. On 23 August 2007, it was carved out of the pre-existing Kolar district, which was the fourth largest district (before bifurcation) of Karnataka, by moving the talukas of Gauribidanur, Gudibande, Bagepalli, Chikballapur, Manchenahalli, Chelur, Sidlaghatta and Chintamani into the new district. Kannada is the official language.

The town of Chikballapur is the district headquarters and a key transport link in the North Bangalore area. The north-south six-lane National Highway (NH44) as well as the East-West Highway 69 go through the district. A rail line runs north from Bangalore to the town of Chikballapur, east past Doddaganjur to Srinivaspur and south to the town of Kolar.

Bhoga Nandeeshwara Temple (also spelt "Bhoga Nandishwara" or "Bhoga Nandishvara") is a Hindu temple located in Nandi village, at the base of Nandi Hills (or Nandidurga) in the Chikkaballapur district of Karnataka state, India. It is dedicated to the Hindu god Shiva.

== History ==
According to a popular legend, the Marigowda, the son of the chief Avathimalla Biregowda, was hunting one day in the Kodimanchanahalli forest. He found a rabbit standing fearlessly in front of hunting dogs. Excited by this, the chief told his son that it was a sign of the boldness of the local people. So, he obtained permission from the king of Vijayanagara and built a fort and a town. This, in the course of time, developed into the town of Chickballapur. During the rule of Baichegowda, the king of Mysore attacked the fort but had to withdraw due to the interference of Marathas. Dodda Byregowda, who came to power after Baichegowda, resumed control of the territories seized earlier by Mysore. In 1762, during the rule of Chikkappanayaka, Hyder Ali laid siege the town for a period of three months. Then Chikkappanayaka agreed to pay 5-lakhs pagodas, and the army was withdrawn.

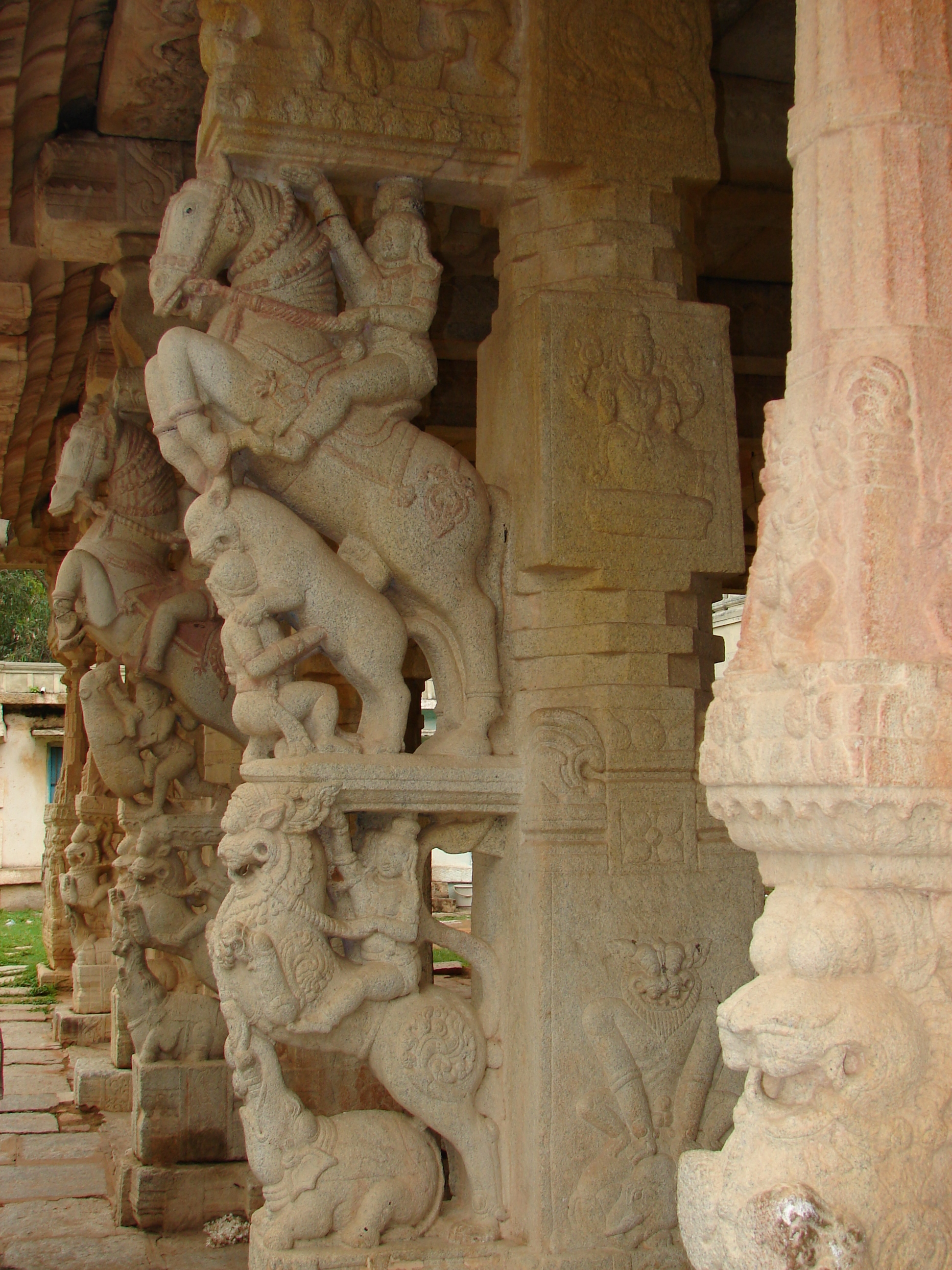
Yali pillars at Ranganatha temple, Rangasthala

After this, Chikkappa Nayaka with the help of Murariraya of Gooty tried to get back his powers. He was hiding at Nandi Hills along with Chikkappa Nayaka. Immediately Hyder Ali took Chickballapur and other places and arrested Chikkappa Nayaka. Then, with the interference of Lord Cornwallis, Chickballapur was handed over to Narayanagowda. Some sources suggest that Lord Cornwallis visited the temple of Lord Shiva in Peresandra, which is 18 km off of Chikkaballapur. A few references in British text suggest that Peresandra has a tremendous history; upon knowing this, Tipu Sultan again acquired Chikballapur. In 1791, the British occupied Nandi and left Narayanagowda to rule the town; due to this, the fight between the Britishers and Tipu Sultan again started. Narayanagowda lost his administration. Later on, the British defeated Tipu Sultan. Chickballapur also came under the administration of Wodeyars of Mysore, which is now a part of Karnataka.

Vidhura, the ancient leader of the Kuru Kingdom (c. 400 BC - 400 AD), is also associated with the area. He is believed to have planted a banyan tree that still stands in the village of Vidhurashwatha.

== Demographics ==
Historical population
Year	Pop.	±% p.a.
1901	332,421	—
1911	352,424	+0.59%
1921	357,812	+0.15%
1931	380,912	+0.63%
1941	417,371	+0.92%
1951	479,068	+1.39%
1961	568,322	+1.72%
1971	690,083	+1.96%
1981	861,098	+2.24%
1991	1,005,031	+1.56%
2001	1,149,007	+1.35%
2011	1,255,104	+0.89%

Religions in Chikkaballapura district (2011)
Religion	Percent
Hinduism	87.65%
Islam	11.78%
Other or not stated	0.57%

As of the 2011 census Chikkaballapur district had a population of 1,255,104, roughly equal to the nation of Trinidad and Tobago or the US state of New Hampshire. This gave it a ranking of 385th in population of districts in India (out of a total of 640). The district had a population density of 298 inhabitants per square kilometre (770/sq mi). Its population growth rate over the decade 2001-2011 was 9.17%. Chikkaballapura had a sex ratio of 968 females for every 1000 males, and a literacy rate of 70.08%. 22.40% of the population lives in urban areas. Scheduled Castes and Scheduled Tribes make up 24.90% and 12.47% of the population respectively.

Languages of Chikkaballapura district (2011)
1. Kannada (59.4%)
2. Telugu (27.1%)
3. Urdu (11.6%)
4. Others (1.96%)

At the time of the 2011 census, 59.37% of the population spoke Kannada, 27.07% Telugu and 11.60% Urdu as their first language.
