= Malur =

- Taluk
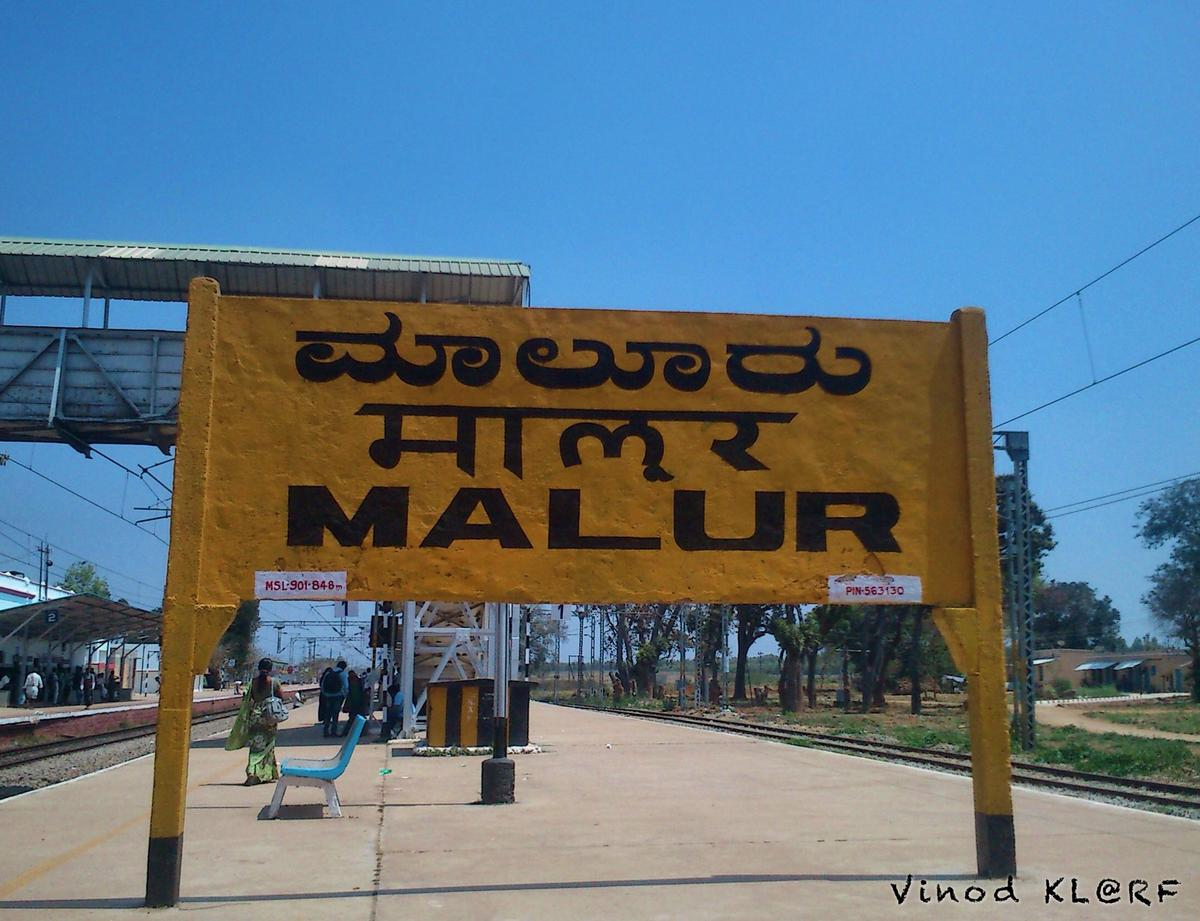
- Malur railway station
- Nickname: Mallikapura
- Location in Karnataka, India
- Coordinates: 13.021°N 77.938°E
- Country: India
- State: Karnataka
- District: Kolar

Area
  - Total: 7.12 km^{2} (2.75 sq mi)
- Elevation: 909 m (2,982 ft)

Population (2011)
  - Total: 40,050

Languages
  - Official: Kannada
  - Regional: Kannada
- Time zone: UTC+5:30 (IST)
- PIN: 563 130
- Telephone code: 91-80
- Vehicle registration: KA08

Malur or Maalooru is a town and taluk headquarters in Kolar district of the Indian state of Karnataka. It is 30 km from Kolar, the district headquarters, and about 50 km from Bangalore.

== Geography ==
Malur is located at 13.00°N 77.94°E. It has an average elevation of 910 metres (2,990 ft). It has a tropical wet and dry climate, similar to Bangalore. It has summer temperatures rarely crossing 37°C, and winter temperatures rarely falling below 15°C.

Malur lies just 15km away from the Tamil Nadu border, and 55km from the Andhra Pradesh border.

== Demographics ==
As of 2011 India Census, Malur had a population of 40,050. Males constituted 20,337 of the population and females 19,673. Malur had an average literacy rate of 82.47% higher than the state average of 75.36%: male literacy was 87.40%, and female literacy was 77.36%. In Malur, 4,589 people, or 11.46% of the population, was under 6 years of age.

== Notable people ==
- Masti Venkatesha Iyengar, writer
