= Kolar, Karnataka =

City in Karnataka, India

Kolar
- City
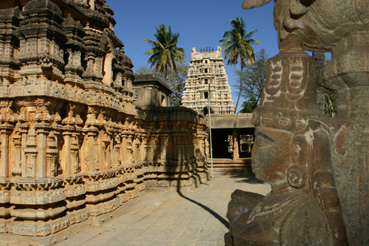
- Someshwara Temple
- Nickname: Kuvaḻālapura (old)
- Interactive map of Kolar
- Coordinates: 13.1333°N 78.1333°E
- Country: India
- State: Karnataka
- District: Kolar

Government
  - Type: Municipal Council
  - Body: Kolar Municipal Council

Area
  - Total: 46.56 km^{2} (17.98 sq mi)
- Elevation: 849 m (2,785 ft)

Population (2011)
  - Total: 138,462
  - Density: 2,974/km^{2} (7,702/sq mi)

Languages
  - Official: Kannada
- Time zone: UTC+5:30 (IST)
- PIN: 563101, 563102, 563103
- Telephone code: 08152
- Vehicle registration: KA-07
- Website: www.kolarcity.gov.in www.kolarcity.mrc.gov.in

Kolar or Kolāra (Kannada: [koːlaːrɐ], historically "Kuvaḻālapura") is a city in the Indian state of Karnataka. It is the headquarters of Kolar district. The city is known for its milk production and gold mines. It is also known for the Someshwara and Kolaramma temples.

== History ==
The Western Gangas sovereignty lasted from about 350 to 550 CE, initially ruled from Kolar as their Capital City. The founder of the Western Ganga dynasty was Konganivarman Madhava, who built Kolar as his capital around 350 and ruled for about twenty years. He was succeeded by his son Madhava I. Kolar, the headquarters of the Kolar district, was earlier known as Kuvaḻālapura, also known as Kolahala Pura. Historically, Kolar is said to be associated with the epic age, which recalls many legends associated with Avani in Mulabagilu Taluk, which was also called Avani Kshetra.

It was once known as Avantika - Kshetra, a sacred place in Kolar district in Karnataka State. It was famous for its religious establishments from ancient times. It was once known as Aavanya which was under the Ganga prince Madhava Muttarasa, who governed several districts. In about AD 890, its earliest grant relates that Tribhuvana Kartara Deva, who held the title of Kali Yuga Rudra, ruled over the Avaniya Thana for 40 years. During this period he constructed 50 temples and two large tanks. Maharshi Valmiki, the author of the epic Ramayana, lived here. The legend goes further to establish that Seetha Devi, after being sent to exile, gave birth to her twins Lava and Kusha at Avani. The Avani continued to survive as a religious establishment from the 9th to 11th centuries. There are temples dedicated to Lord Rama.

The hill to the west of Kolar called the Shatasringa Parvata or 'Hundred-Peaked Mountain' is 'Antharagange', associated with the story of Parasurama and his fight with King Kartaviryarjuna over Surabhi, the divine cow. As the story goes, King Kartavirya Arjuna (Sahasrarjuna) and his army visited Jamadagni, Parasurama's father, when the king demanded the magical cow from Jamadagni. When Jamadagni refused, the King sent his soldiers to take the cow, but Parashurama killed the entire army and the king with his axe. In return, the princes beheaded Jamadagni. Thus, Parasurama took an oath to behead the entire Kshatriya race, which is said to have taken place on the hills. It is said that the 'kolahala' on the death of Kartaviryarjuna gave its name to the town, which later become Kolar. Gangas built the temple of Sri Uttameshwara temple in Uttanur Mulbagal Taluk.

Antaragange is one of the tourist attractions of Kolar. It is also known as "Dakshina Kashi Kshetra". In the temple is a pond which gets a continuous flow of underground water from the mouth of a Basava (stone bull).

== Geography ==
Kolar is located at 13.13°N 78.13°E. with an average elevation of 849 metres (2,785 ft).

It is located at a distance of about 70 kilometres (43 mi) from Bangalore, 50 kilometres (31 mi) from Kempegowda International Airport, 147 kilometres (91 mi) from Hogenakkal waterfalls & 32 kilometres (20 mi) from Kolar Gold Fields. The city is located on the southern maidan (plains) region of Karnataka. The Ammerallikere, a tank, forms its eastern boundary. To the north is the Kodikannur tank, the main source of water supply to the city. The nearest railway junction is Bangarapet Junction railway station. It is situated on the Bangalore - Chennai National Highway 75.

Kolar is also the gateway to Tirumala and Chennai via National Highway 75.

=== Climate ===
The city is ranked among top 10 Indian cities with the cleanest air and best AQI in 2024.

== Demographics ==
As of the 2011 census, Kolar city municipality had a population of 138,462 and has 30,506 households. The population of scheduled castes in the city is 16,536, while that of scheduled tribes is 2094. The city has grown at the rate of 21.56% in the last decade.

The municipality had a sex ratio of 978 females per 1,000 males and 11.5% of the population were under six years old. Effective literacy was 84.02%; male literacy was 87.28% and female literacy was 80.69%.

Religions in Kolar city (2011)
Religion	Percent
Hinduism	51.13%
Islam	46.51%
Christianity	1.98%
Other or not stated	0.36%

Kolar is a city with Hindus and Muslims in nearly equal population. Christians are a small minority.

Languages of Kolar city (2011)
1. Urdu (46.5%)
2. Kannada (36.3%)
3. Telugu (11.5%)
4. Tamil (3.04%)
5. Hindi (1.20%)
6. Others (1.49%)

At the time of the 2011 census, 46.49% of the population spoke Urdu, 36.26% Kannada, 11.52% Telugu, 3.04% Tamil and 1.20% Hindi as their first language. Kolar is part of Morasu Nadu, where Kannada, Telugu and Tamil languages and cultures blend. After Bangalore, it is the most diversified city. The Kannadigas are a minority here as flow of other people were huge. Tamils and Telugus are native to this city and have been here for centuries.

== Governance and politics ==
Kolar city is governed by Kolar City Municipal Council. The municipality covers an area of 18.3 square km and is divided into 35 wards, each represented by a councillor. It is headed by the Municipal Commissioner, R. Srikanth. The president is the elected head, currently incumbent B.M. Mubarak. The executive wing has 8 departments: engineering, health, revenue, town planning, finance, birth and death, election and day-NULM.

=== Civic utilities ===
The masterplan of the city is developed by the Urban Development Department, State of Karnataka. Kodikannur tank in the north of the city is its main source of water supply. The city has a shortage of drinking water, being an area with a 'permanent drought', and pipes being over 35 years old. Water is also supplied from four borewells at Maderahalli tank, and five more borewells that were revived in April 2020. According to the city municipality's website, the city receives a total of 56.20 MLD water, at 125 LPCD per capita.

The city has both open and closed drains. Kolar receives wastewater from Bangalore as part of the KC project, which was expected to increase groundwater levels but has received criticism when it started contaminating the area. In 2017, it was reported that non-clearance of garbage by the municipal council had caused unhygienic conditions in the city.

== Tourist attractions ==
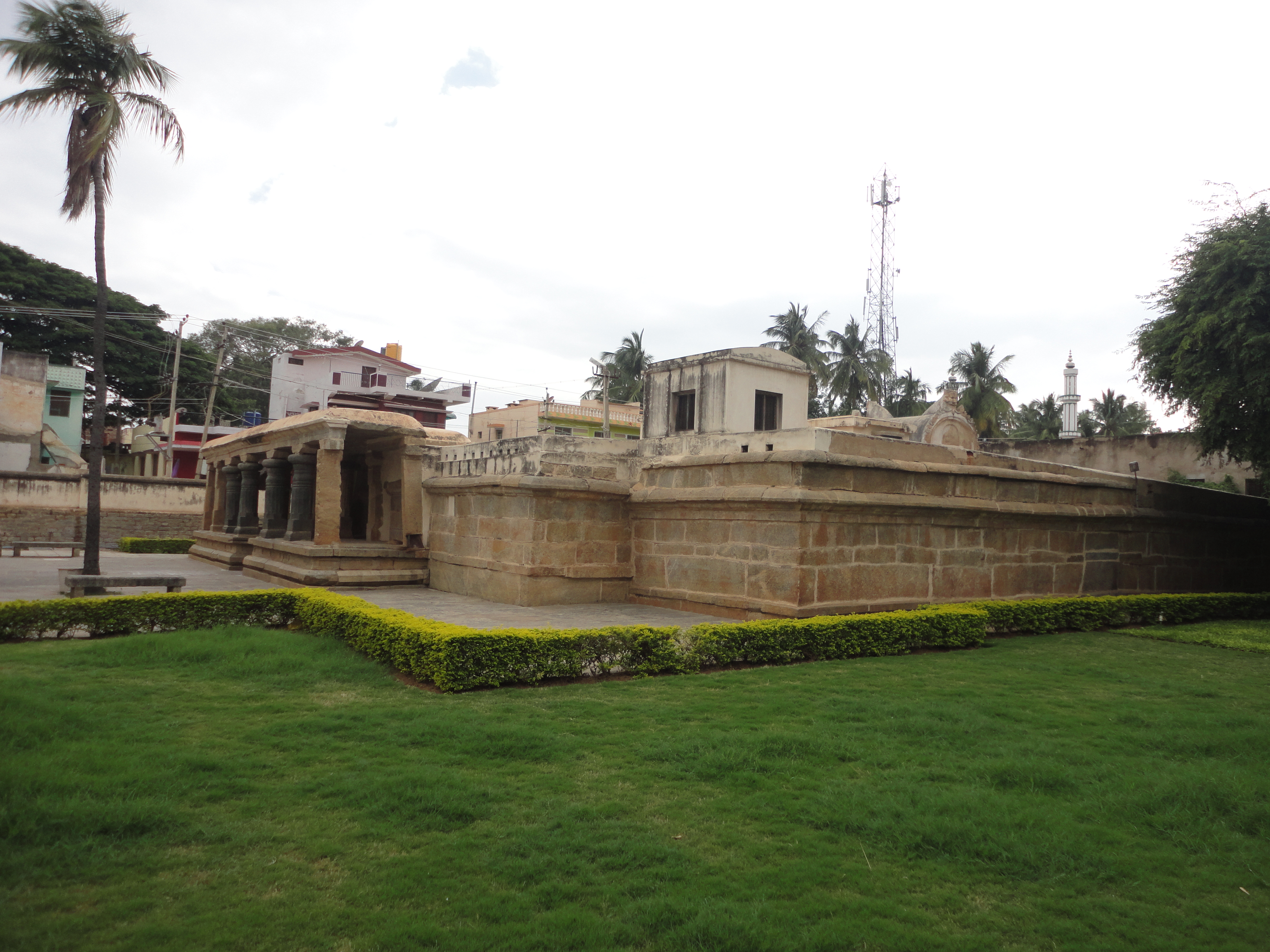
Kolaramma Temple, Kolar

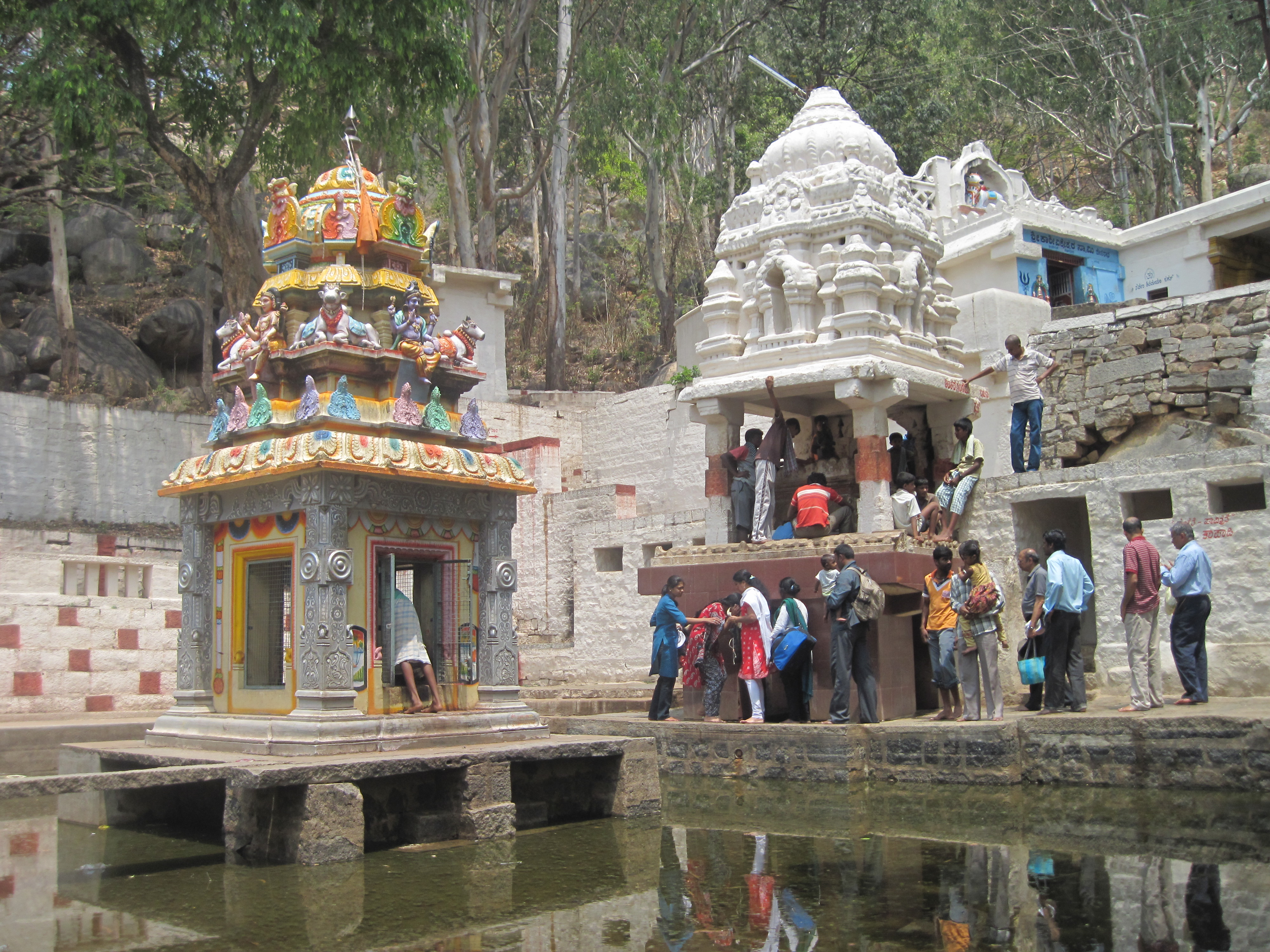
Antharagange

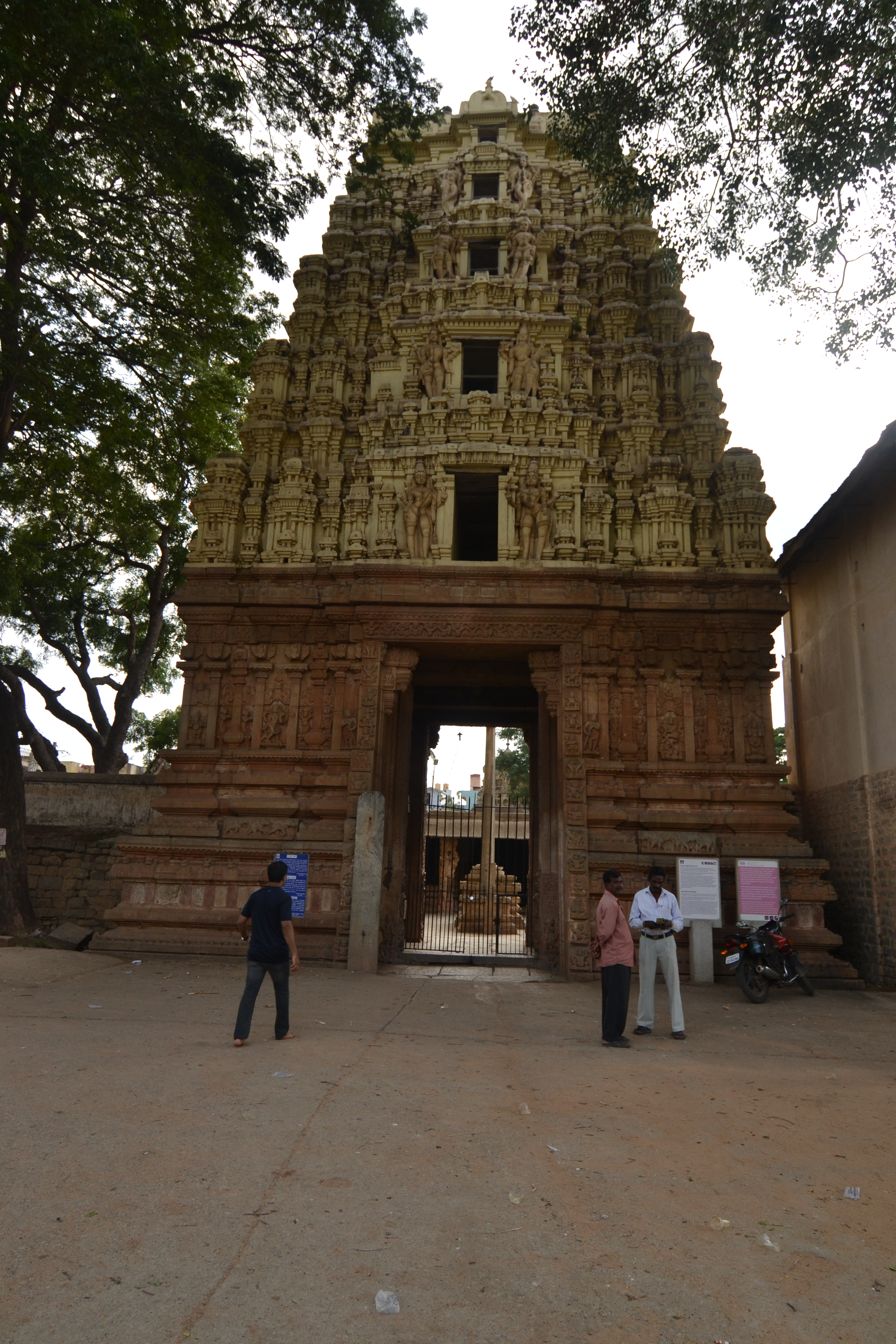
Entrance of Somnatheshwar Temple in Kolar

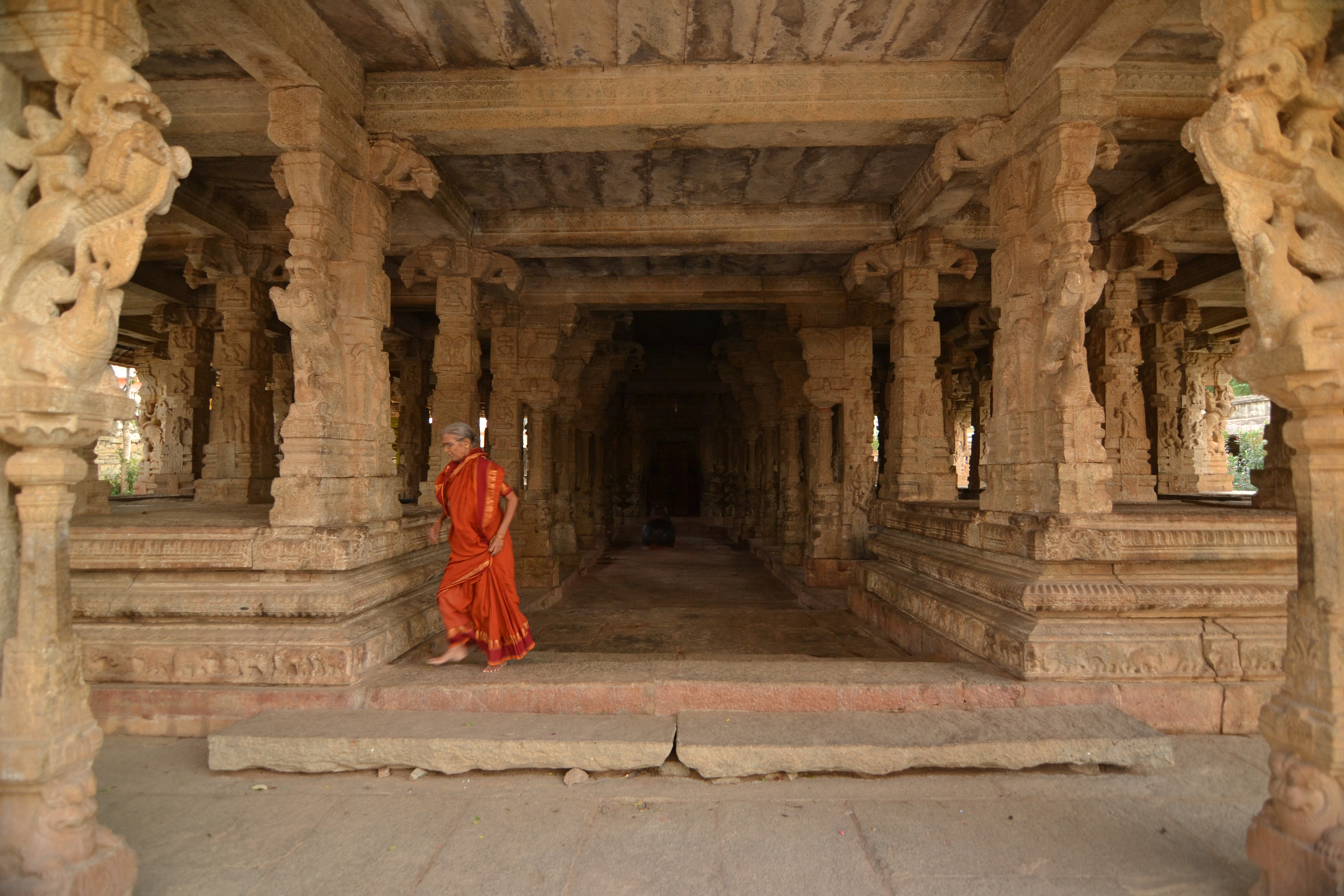
Main Structure of the Somnatheshwar temple, Kolar

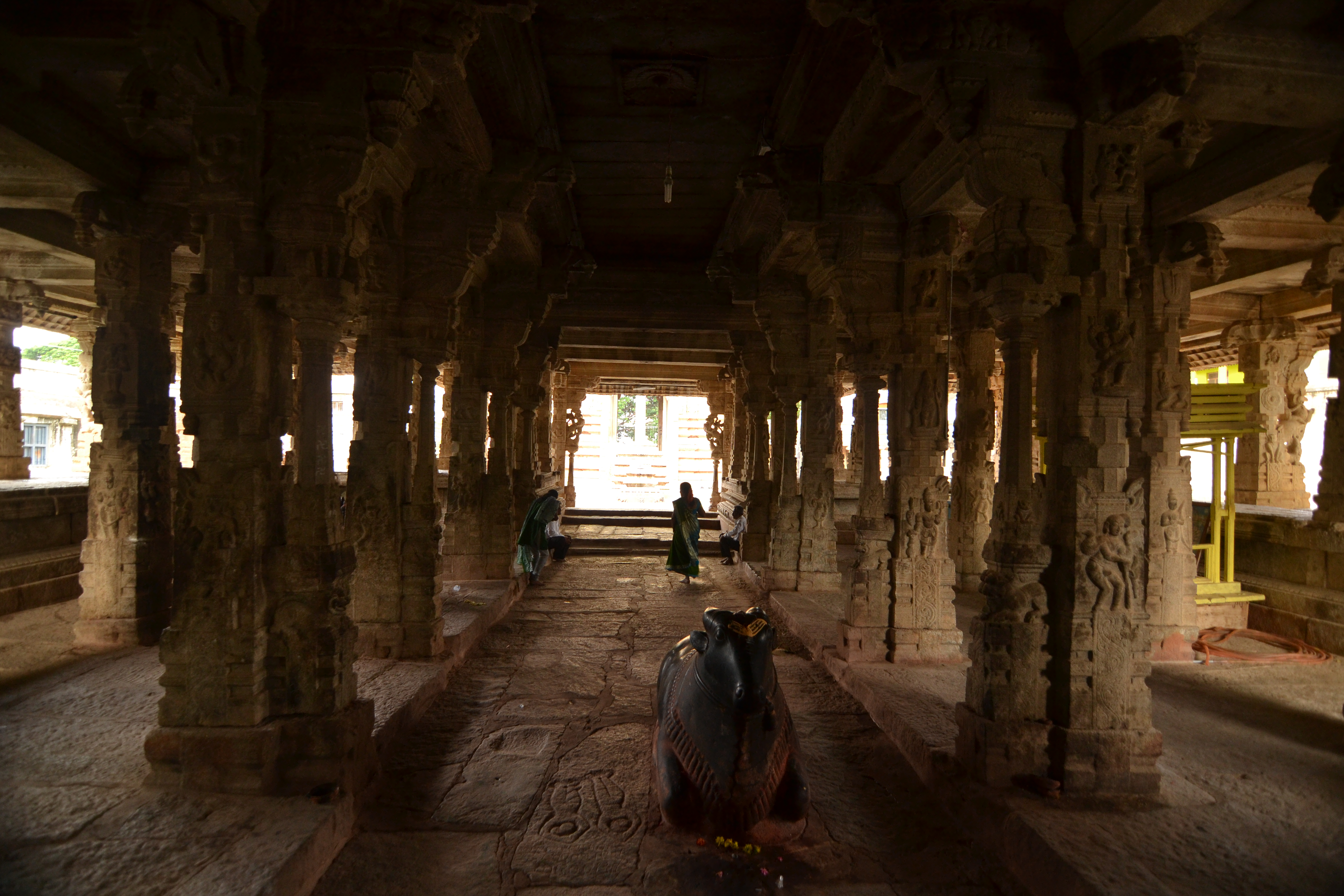
Interior view of the Somnatheshwar temple, Kolar

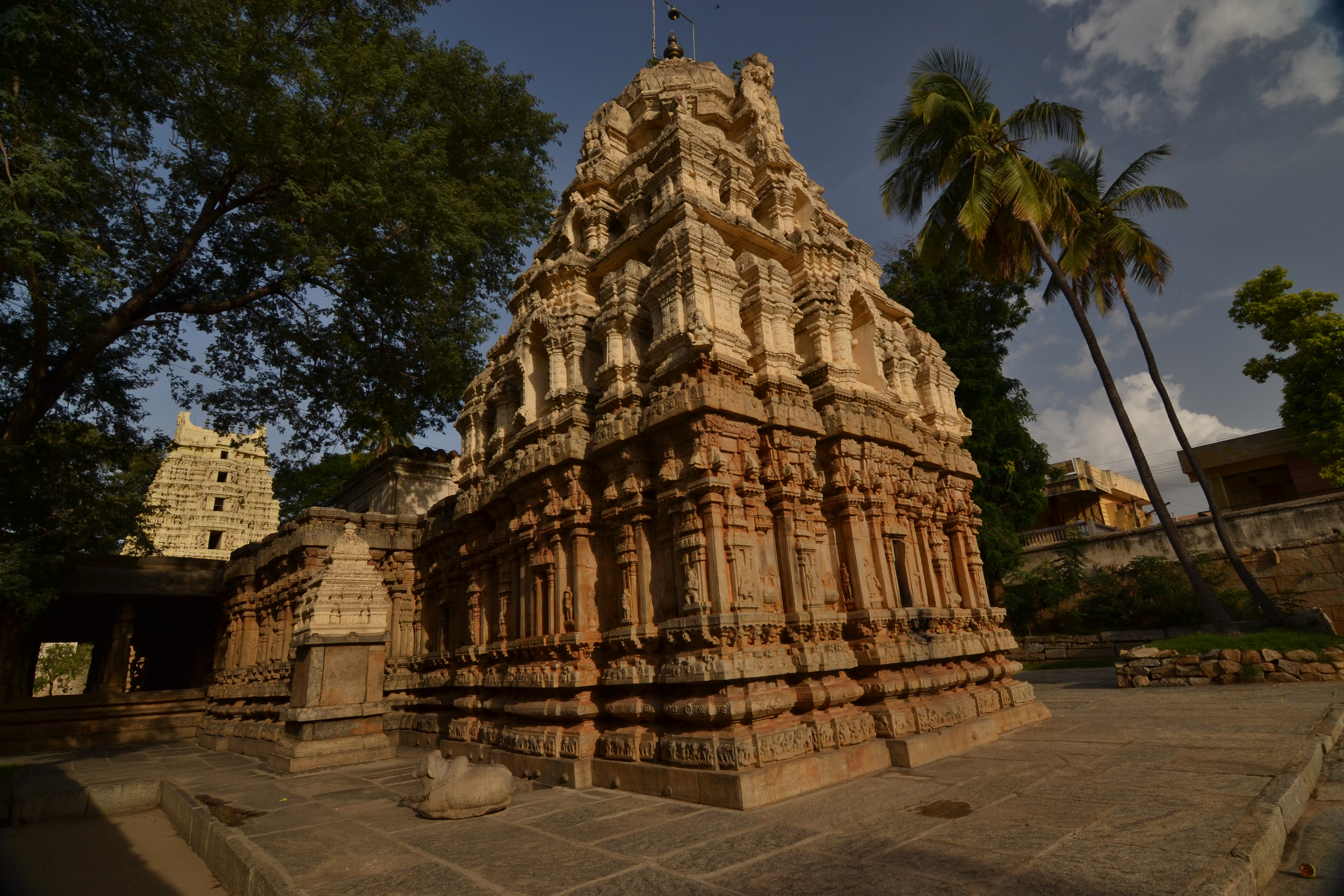
Back side view of Somnatheshwar temple, Kolar

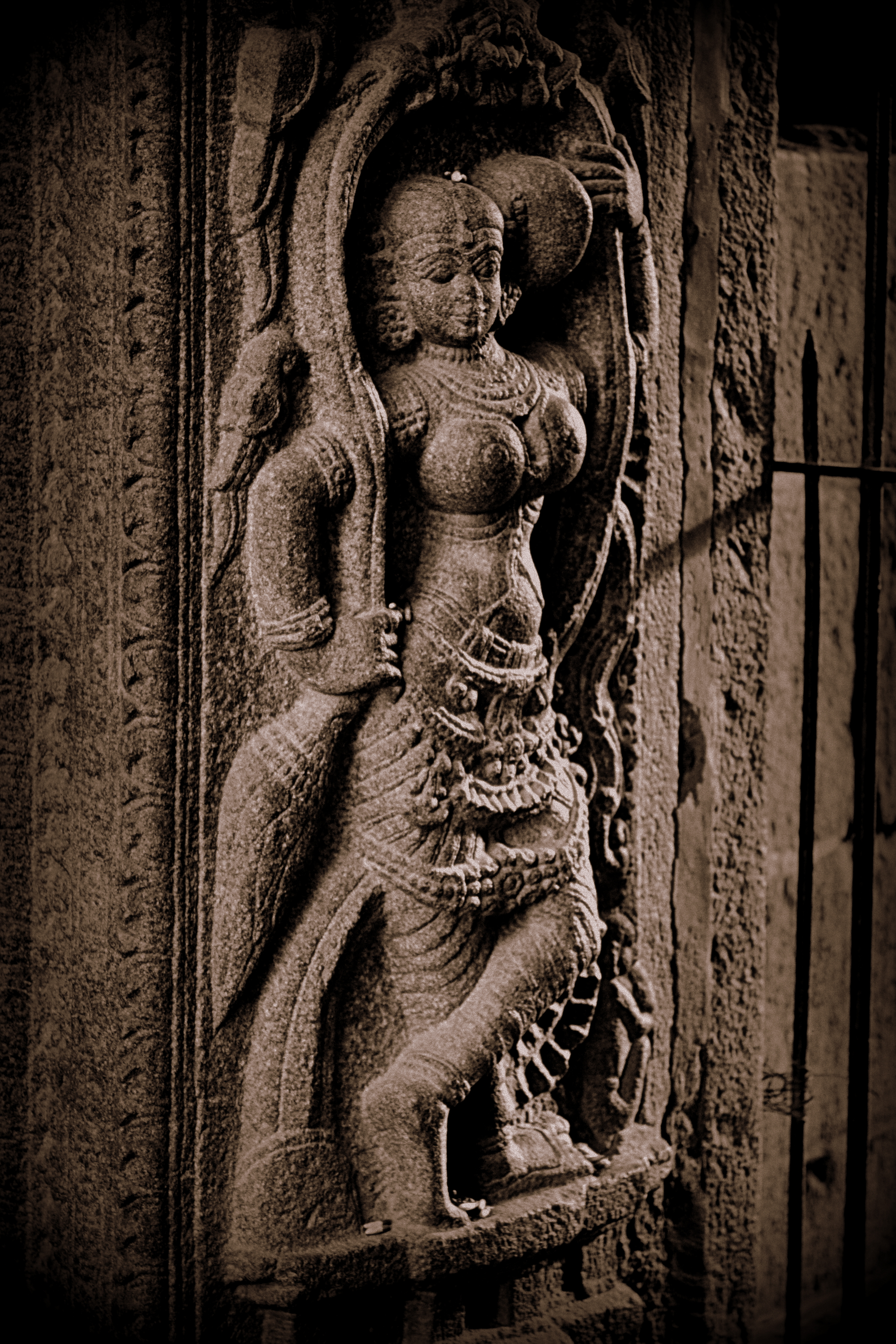
Sculpture of a Guardian goddess at the Kolaramma Temple

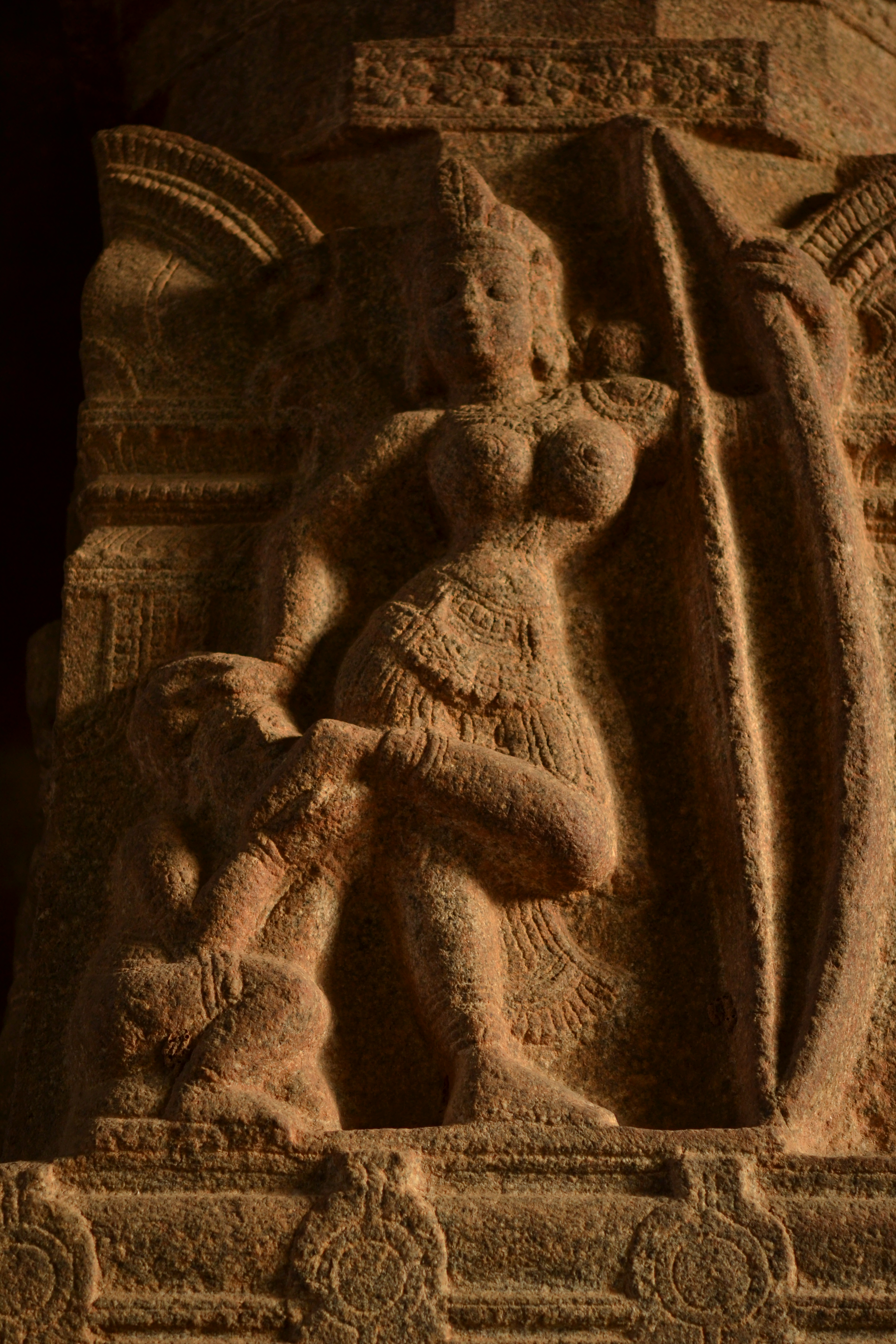
A sculpture adorning entrance wall of Kolarmma Temple

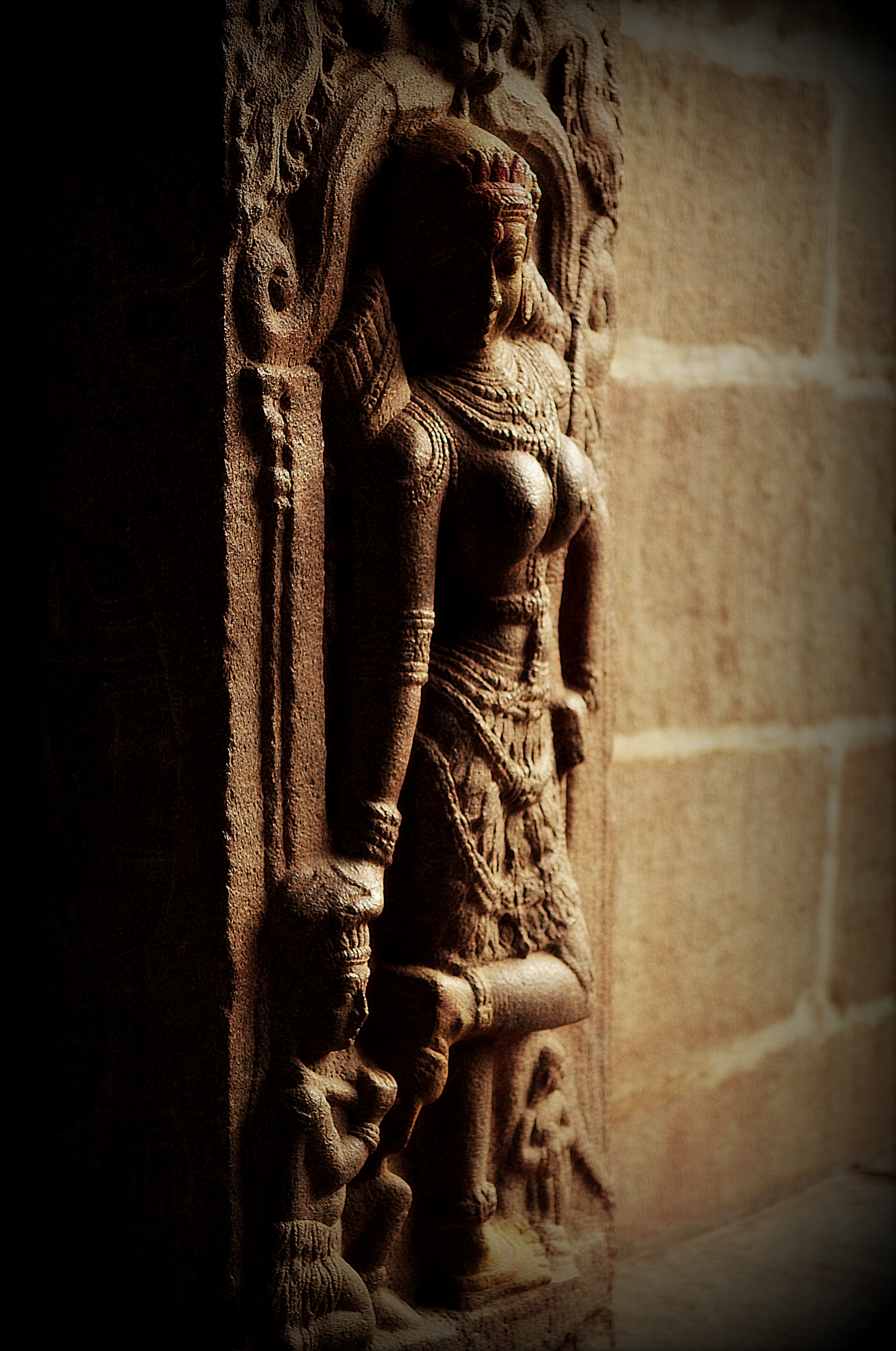
A sculpture adorning interior gate of Kolarmma Temple

== Transportation ==
Kolar has transportation amenities such as buses, taxis, and auto rickshaws.

Kolar also has a local transportation facility " Antaragange Kolara Nagara Sarige" which was inaugurated in July 2012 but Govt has stopped this services and utilising these buses for rural areas.

=== Railways ===
The district headquarters has a railway station connecting two destinations:

1. Bangalore - Via Bangarapet Junction railway station

The nearest junction to Kolar is Bangarapet Junction railway station. It is the first railway junction in Karnataka on Chennai Central– Bengaluru City line

2. Bangalore - Via Srinivaspura, Chinthamani, Sidlaghatta, Chikkaballapura, Devanahalli, Yelahanka

== Educational institutes ==
- Bengaluru North University, Sri Devaraj Urs Extension, NH 75, Tamaka, Kolar-563103.
- Sri Devaraj Urs Medical College (SDUMC) - Next to Horticulture college, NH 75, Tamaka, Kolar-563103.

== Notable people ==
- M. Visvesvaraya – Celebrated Indian Engineer and Statesman, also known as "Father of Indian Engineering" and "The architect of modern Karnataka".
- D. V. Gundappa – was an Indian writer, Kannada poet and philosopher.
- Masti Venkatesha Iyengar – Kannada poet and recipient of Jnanpith Award
- B. K. S. Iyengar - Founder of the style of yoga as exercise known as "Iyengar Yoga", considered one of the foremost yoga gurus in the world.
- N. R. Narayana Murthy - is an Indian billionaire businessman and the founder of Infosys.
- K. C. Reddy – First Chief Minister of Karnataka, (then Mysore State)
- Hyder Ali – Ruler of Mysore Kingdom, Father of Tippu Sultan.
- Prashanth Neel- Renowned Indian Movie Director of K.G.F: Chapter 1 and K.G.F: Chapter 2 fame.
- A. N. Prahlada Rao - highest Crossword writer in India.
- K. H. Muniyappa – is an Indian Politician. He is a member of the Indian National Congress (INC) political party.
- Mallikarjuna Reddy – Guinness World Record holder, Micro Artist, Miniature artist.
- S. Muniswamy - is an Indian politician, a member of Bharatiya Janata Party (BJP) and MP of Kolar.
- B. G. L. Swamy - an Indian botanist and Kannada writer who was professor, head of the botany department and principal of Presidency College, Chennai.
- Soundarya - was an Indian actress known for her works primarily in Kannada and Telugu.
- K. N. Ganeshaiah - is an agricultural scientist and an Emeritus professor and a novelist specialising in thrillers, and writes in the Kannada language.
