= Agara =

Agara may refer to a place in:

== Georgia ==
- Agara, Georgia, station at Khashuri–Vale railway line

== India ==
- Agara, Chamarajanagar, Chamarajanagar District, Karnataka
- Agara, Bengaluru, a panchayat village in Bengaluru Urban district, Karnataka
- Agara, Bengaluru South district, Karnataka
- Agara, Malur, a village in Malur Taluka, Kolar District, Karnataka
- Agara, Mulbagal, a panchayat village in Mulbagi Taluka, Kolar district, Karnataka
- Agara, a village in Tayalur panchayat village, Karnataka

== Nepal ==
- Agara, Makwanpur, Nepal

== See also ==
- Agra (disambiguation)
