= Samsa =

Samsa may refer to:

- Samsa (writer), Indian playwright
- Samsa (food), a central Asian samosa
- Gregor Samsa, the main character in Franz Kafka's The Metamorphosis
