= Agara, Mulbagal =

Agara
- village
- Interactive map of Agara
- Coordinates: 13.0556°N 78.4319°E
- Country: India
- State: Karnataka
- District: Kolar
- Talukas: Mulbagal

Government
  - Body: Village Panchayat

Languages
  - Official: Kannada
- Time zone: UTC+5:30 (IST)
- Nearest city: Kolar
- Civic agency: Village Panchayat

Agara is a panchayat village in the southern state of Karnataka, India. It is located in the Mulbagal Taluka of Kolar district in Karnataka. There is another village named "Agara" in the Tayalur gram panchayat of Mulbagal Taluka: Agara, Tayalur.

== Divisions ==
The Agara gram panchayat governs six villages:

- Agara
- Koladevi
- Kondenahalli
- Mandikal
- Murakanakunte
- S. Bisanahalli

== See also ==
- Kolar
