= Agara, Chamarajanagar =

Village in Karnataka, India

Agara
- village
- Interactive map of Agara
- Coordinates: 12.1150°N 77.0738°E
- Country: India
- State: Karnataka
- District: Chamarajanagar
- Talukas: Yelandur

Government
  - Body: Village Panchayat

Languages
  - Official: Kannada
- Time zone: UTC+5:30 (IST)
- ISO 3166 code: IN-KA
- Vehicle registration: KA10
- Nearest city: Chamarajanagar
- Civic agency: Village Panchayat
- Website: karnataka.gov.in

Agara is a village in the southern state of Karnataka, India. It is located in the Yelandur taluk of Chamarajanagar district in Karnataka.

== Noted people ==
- Samsa - Kannada's first historical playwright, was born as A. N. Swamy Venkatadri Iyer in Agara village.
- Agaram Rangaiah - freedom fighter and editor of Sadhvi paper for 63 years, was born in this village.

== See also ==
- Chamarajanagar
