= Samsa (writer) =

Indian playwright

A. N. Swamy Venkatadri Iyer
- Samsa
- Born: 13 January 1898; Agara, Yelandur, Kingdom of Mysore (now in Karnataka),
- Died: 14 February 1939 (aged 41); Mysore, Karnataka, India
- Occupations: Teacher; playwright; novelist
- Parent(s): Narasimha Panditha; Gowramma
- Writing career
- Pen name: Samsa
- Language: Kannada
- Genre: Drama (historical)

A. N. Swamy Venkatadri Iyer (13 January 1898 – 14 February 1939), known by his pen name as Samsa, was an early 20th century's Indian historical playwright in Kannada language. His plays Suguna Gambhira, Vigada Vikramaraya and Bettada Arasu have been made into stage dramas and prescribed as textbooks in various universities in Karnataka. He was called as Shakespeare of Kannada Drama. An open-air theatre in the premises of government owned Ravindra Kalakshetra, is named after Samsa.

== Personal life ==
Samsa was born as Venkatadri Iyer to Narasimha Pandita and Gowramma in Agara, Yelandur in erstwhile Kingdom of Mysore. He worked in various schools and offices as teacher and clerk across Mysore, Hassan, Mumbai and other places. He was known for his eccentric behavior. He remained unmarried and led a secluded life. He suffered from Persecution Complex and used to wander from one place to another.

== As writer ==
It's said that Samsa had written more than 23 dramas out of which only 6 are available. He is regarded as the first historical playwright in modern Kannada literature. His plays were based on the administration and history of Mysore kings in the Kingdom of Mysore. The language he used in dramas was Halegannada (lit. 'old Kannada').

=== Plays ===
- Suguna Gambhira
- Birudanthembara Ganda
- Vigada Vikramaraya
- Bettada Arasu
- Vijayanarasimha
- Manthrashakti

=== Novels ===
- Koushala
- Sherlock Homes in Jail

=== Poems ===
- Shreemanthodyana Varnanam
- Samsapadam
- Eeshaprakopana
- Naraka Duryodhaneeyam
- Acchumba

== Death ==
Samsa committed suicide on 14 February 1939 in a small room of Sadvidya School, Mysore where he spent last years of his life. He left a suicide note:

“I am leaving thirty one rupees, one anna and nine pies in the purse in my pocket; this amount is, after my death for my body to be cremated, which I wish to be cremated in some open place and without any religious ceremony whatsoever, as I have no faith in any religion”.

== Books on Samsa ==
Many writers have tried bringing things out from Samsa's secluded life. Notable works on him are:

- "Samsa Kavi" (Biography) – G. P. Rajarathnam
- "Samsa Smarane: Jeevana Chithrana" – Aa. Na. Subramanyam
- "Neegikonda Samsa" (play) – Ki. Ram. Nagaraj
- "Samsa" (novel) – Prof. Maleyur Guruswamy
