= Tayalur =

Coordinates: 12°35′N 78°40′E

Tayalur ತಾಯಲುರು
- village
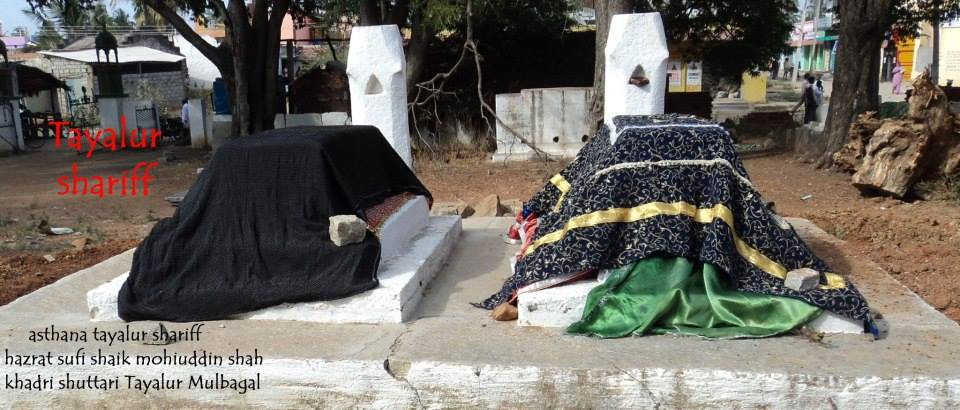
- Dargah of Sufi saint Hazrat Shaik mohiuddin shah khadri shuttari RA
- Nickname: Tayalur
- Interactive map of Tayalur
- Country: India
- State: Karnataka
- District: Kolar
- Talukas: Mulbagal

Government
  - Body: Village Panchayat

Languages
  - Official: Kannada & Telugu
- Time zone: UTC+5:30 (IST)
- Nearest city: Kolar
- Civic agency: Village Panchayat

Tayalur is a panchayat village in the southern state of Karnataka, India famous for dargah of Sufi saint Hazrat shaik mohiuddin shah khadri shuttari R.A. It is located in the Mulbagal Taluka of Kolar district in Karnataka.

== Divisions ==
The Tayalur gram panchayat governs six villages:

- T. Agara
- Badenahalli
- Dasepalli
- Kothapalli
- Tayalur
- Tirumanahalli

== See also ==
- Kolar, Karnataka
