= Adegarahalli =

- village
- Location in Karnataka, India
- Coordinates: 13.59°N 77.76°E
- Country: India
- State: Karnataka
- District: Chikkaballapur district
- Founder: Narasimha Reddy

Area
  - Total: 1.2 km^{2} (0.46 sq mi)

Population (2010)
  - Total: 1,000
  - Density: 830/km^{2} (2,200/sq mi)

Languages
  - Official: Kannada& Telugu
- Time zone: UTC+5:30 (IST)
- PIN: 562 101
- Telephone code: 08156
- Vehicle registration: KA-40

Adegarahalli is a centrally located village in Karnataka. It is located 20 km (12 mi) from Chickballapur, 3 km (1.9 mi) from Mandikal in Chickballapur District and 77 km (48 mi) from Bangalore, the state capital. The main occupation of the people is agriculture. Kannada is the main language spoken.

== Tourism ==
Adegarahalli is a village situated near Peresandra. Peresandra is known for Chukkuli. It has a river and Nagavalli Betta, a hill, which has caves and a temple on its peak.

The hill station of Nandi Hills is situated nearby. The nearby region of Muddenahalli-Kanivenarayanapura is the birthplace of engineer, Sir Mokshagundam Visvesvaraya. There are several educational institutions situated in the region. The engineering institute SJCIT and Sri Bhagavan Sathya Sai Baba's school, university, and hospital are located near Adhegarahalli.

Skandagiri, also known as Kalavara Durga, is an ancient mountain fortress located approximately 3 km from Chikballapur. Overlooks Nandi Hills, Muddenahalli, and Kanivenarayanapura . The peak is at an altitude of about 1,350 m (4,430 ft). Tourist activities conducted there include night treks and altitude camping.

Historic temples are situated in and near Adhegarahalli, including Ellode Sri Lakshmi Adinarayana Swamy Temple, which resides on top of the hill of Ellode, Gudibhanda Taluk, Chickballapur district and Rangasthala (Ranganatha Swami temple), which is situated around 5 km west of Chickballapur.

== Places of interest ==
- Nandi Hills
- Muddenahalli/Kanivenarayanapura
- Skandagiri
- Bengaluru International Airport (in Devanahalli)

== Gallery ==
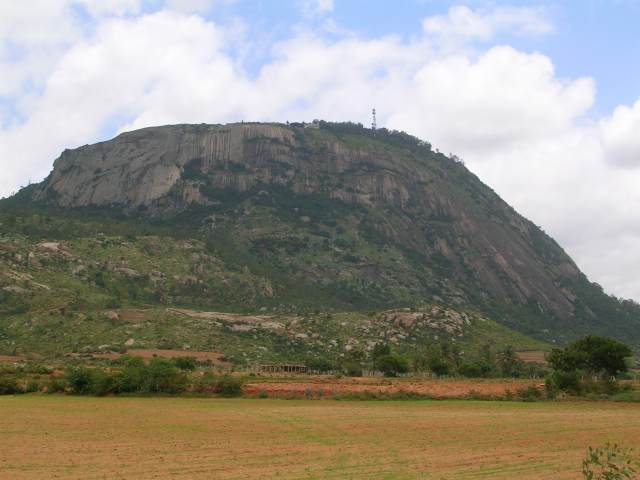
Nandi Hills

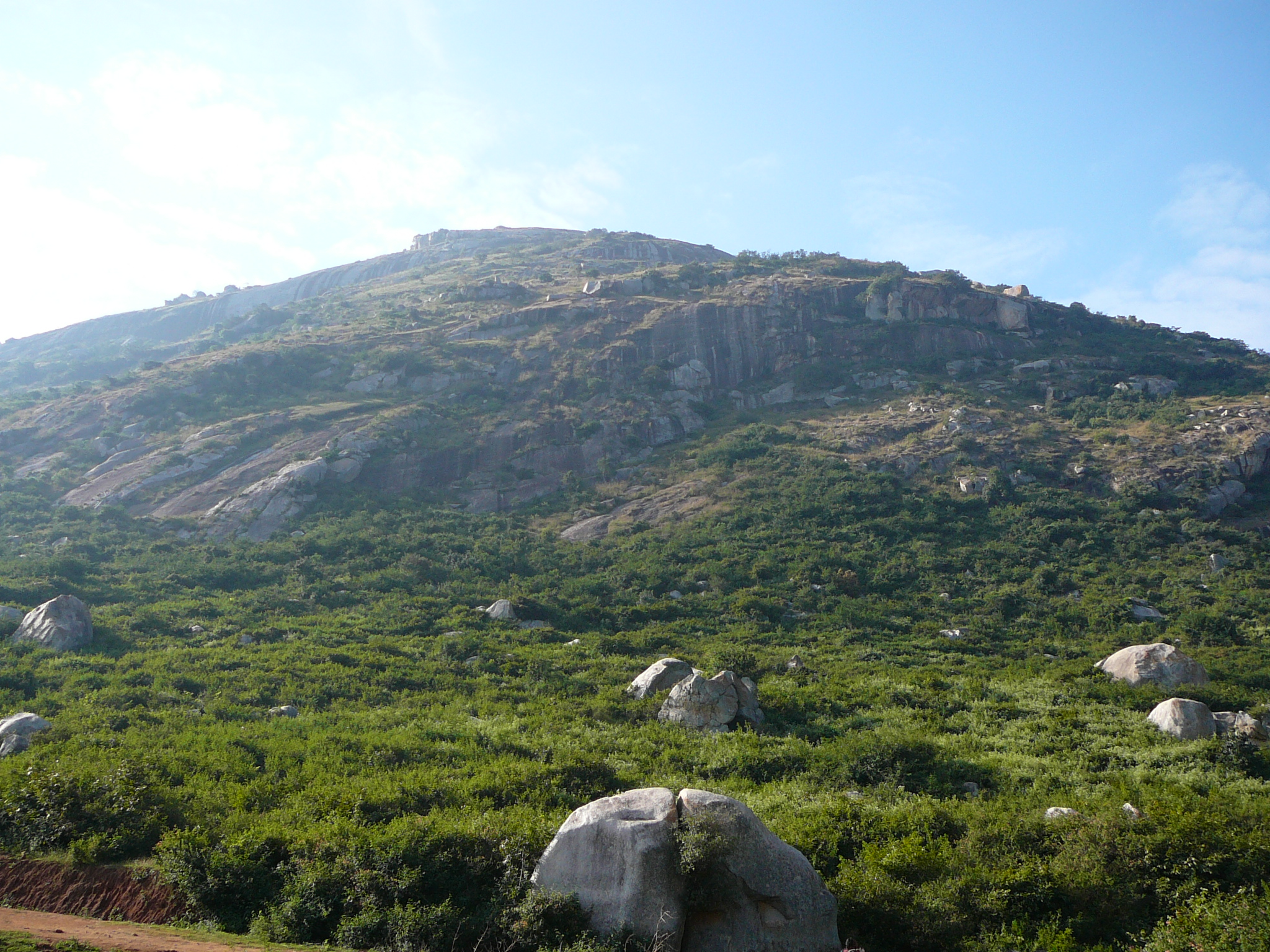
View of Skandagiri Betta From Below the mountain
