= Addagal =

Addagal may refer to:

- Addagal (Chik Ballapur), a village in Karnataka, India
- Addagal (Srinivaspur), a village in Karnataka, India
