= Acharlahalli =

- village
- Acharlahalli is in Bengaluru North district
- Interactive map of Acharlahalli
- Coordinates: 13.3486°N 77.6272°E
- Country: India
- State: Karnataka
- District: Bengaluru North
- Talukas: Dod Ballapur

Government
  - Body: Village Panchayat

Languages
  - Official: Kannada
- Time zone: UTC+5:30 (IST)
- Nearest city: Bengaluru North
- Civic agency: Village Panchayat

Acharlahalli is a village in the southern state of Karnataka, India. It is located 3 km from Nandi Hills and 5 km from Muddenahalli-Kanivenarayanapura. It is located in the Dod Ballapur taluk of Bengaluru North district.

== See also ==
- Bengaluru North district
- Districts of Karnataka
