= Skandagiri =

Mountain fortress in Karnataka, India

Coordinates: 13°25′03″N 77°40′58″E

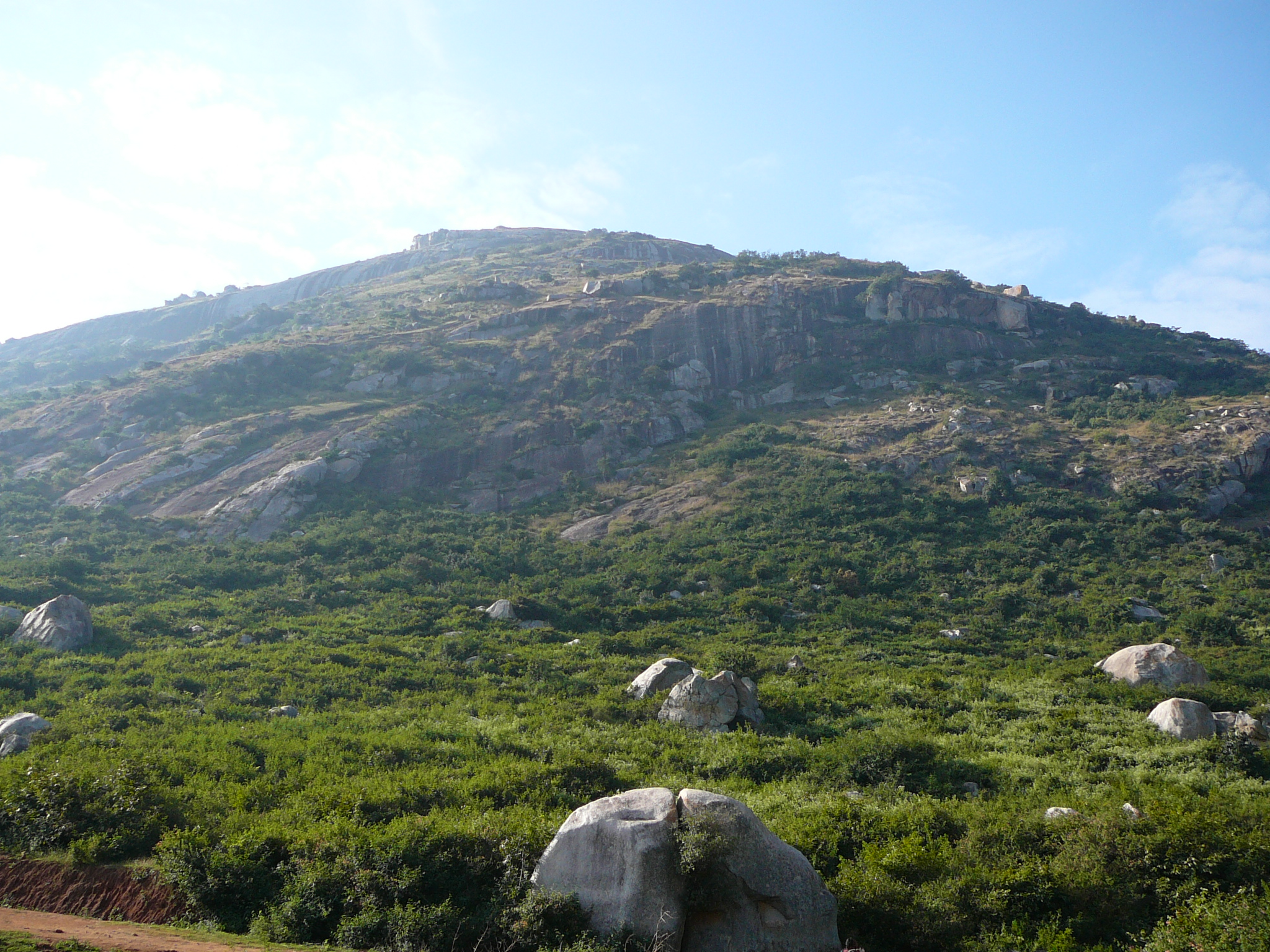
View of Skandagiri Betta From Below the mountain

Skandagiri, also known as Kalavara Durga, is a mountain fortress located approximately 62 km (39 mi) from Bangalore city, and 3 km (1.9 mi) from Chikballapur in the Indian state of Karnataka. It is off Bellary Road (National Highway 7 Hyderabad-Bangalore Highway), and overlooks Nandi Hills and Muddenahalli. The peak is at an altitude of about 1,450 m (4,760 ft). It is accessed from Kalavara village, which has a population of, 1093 according to 2011 census. The hill features the ruins of a fort believed to have been built by Tipu Sultan, the ruler of the Kingdom of Mysore. It was used as a military stronghold and lookout point.

== Trek ==
The Karnataka State Forest and Tourism Department has facilitated the trek and is a favorite destination for many trekkers due to its proximity to Bangalore. Before climbing Skandagiri, you have to pay online fees and make a reservation. Treks starting at 4 am and 8 am are limited to 150 people each. Guides from the Department of Tourism are also available. It takes approximately 5 hours to trek in all seasons.

Start	End	Distance
Papagni Mata	Forest Department Check Post	800 mts
Check Post	Resting place	1100 mts
Rest	Peak	900 mts

The trek starts from behind the Papagni Mutt of Kalwar village is 3 km. m. The trek starts from the Kalwar village behind Papagni matt. Total distance is 3 km (1.9 mi)m. The hill is surrounded by a fort and is at, 1,450 m (4,760 ft) above sea level. In the peak there is a temple and a pond. You can view a few sides of the fort.

It is moderately challenging and takes around 2 to 3 hours to reach the summit. The trail passes through dense forests and rocky terrain, offering a blend of natural beauty and adventure. The trek is popular for night trekking, allowing trekkers to witness the sunrise from the summit.

== Scenic Views ==
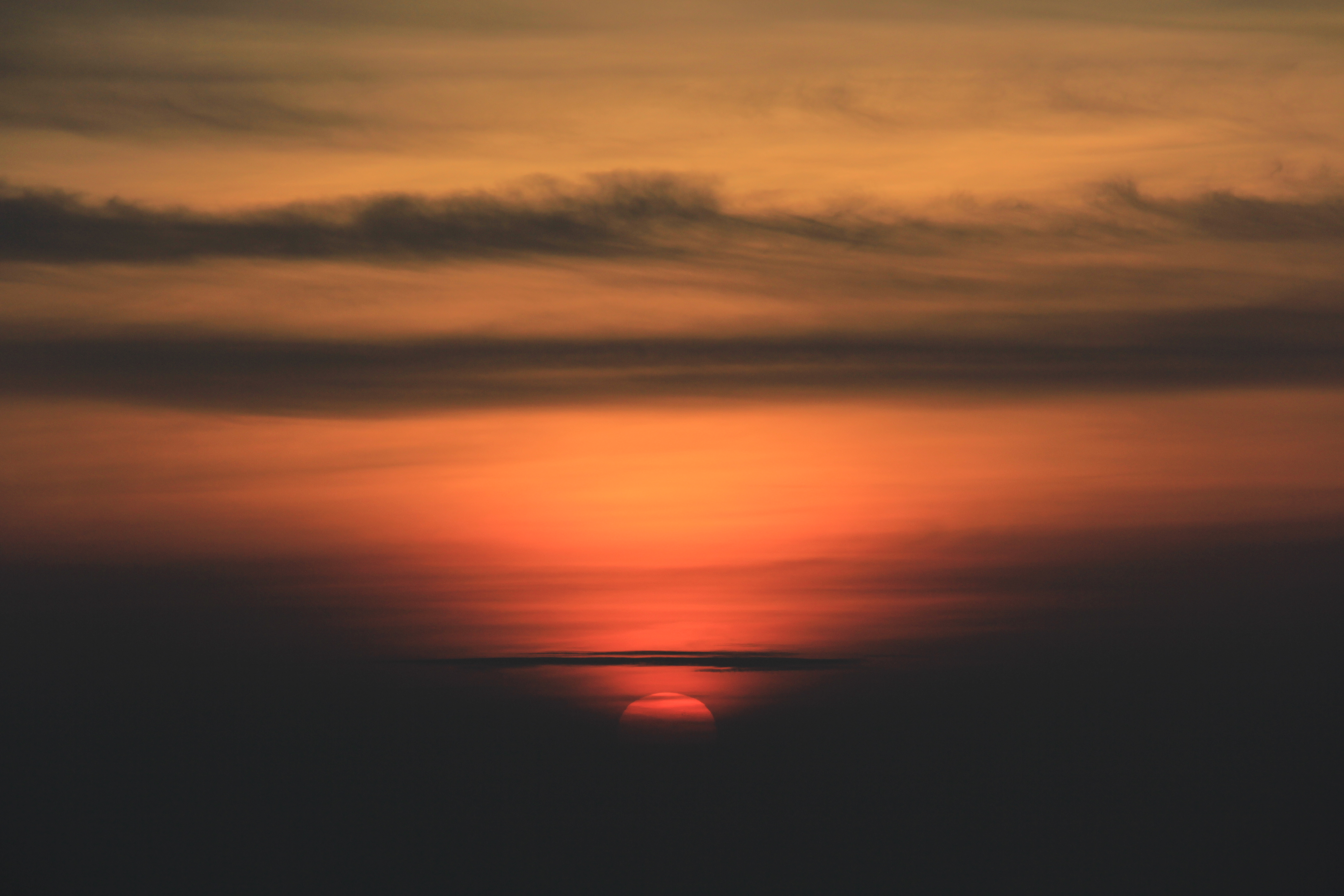
Sun Rise at Skanda Giri

At the summit, trekkers are rewarded with panoramic views of the surrounding landscape, including Nandi Hills and Muddenahalli. The hilltop often experiences a sea of clouds, especially during the early morning, creating a spectacular and surreal atmosphere.

== Nearby Attractions ==
Nandi Hills, Another popular hill station nearby, known for its sunrise views and ancient temples.

Bhoga Nandeeshwara Temple, A historic temple at the base of Nandi Hills, known for its beautiful architecture.

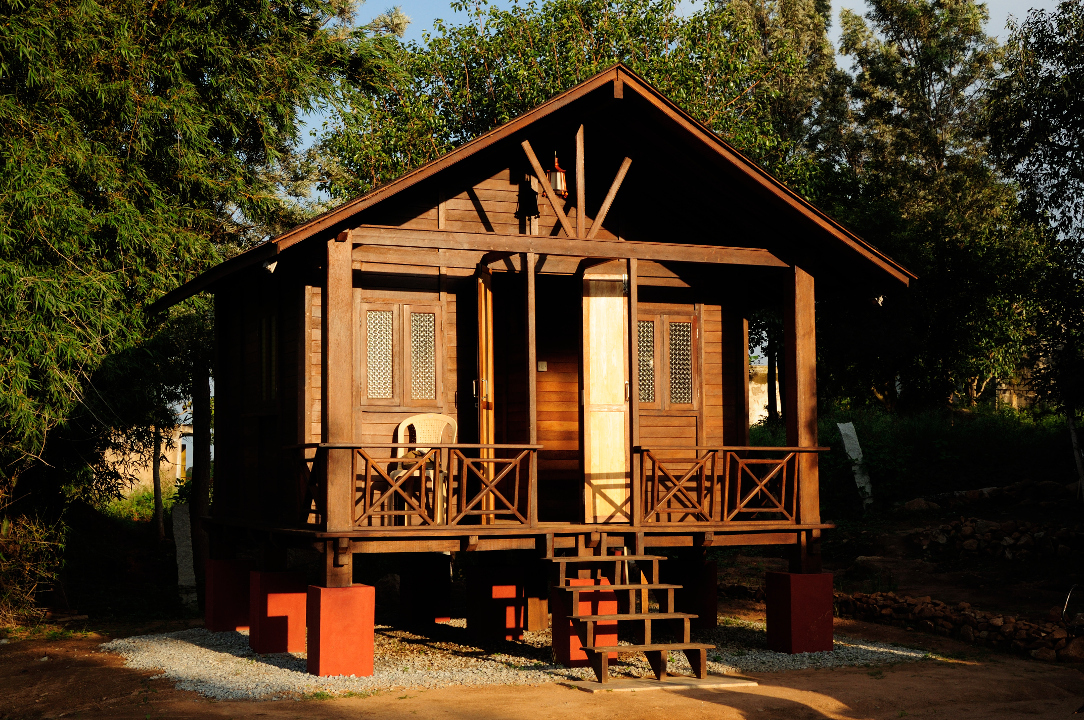
Forest Department Office

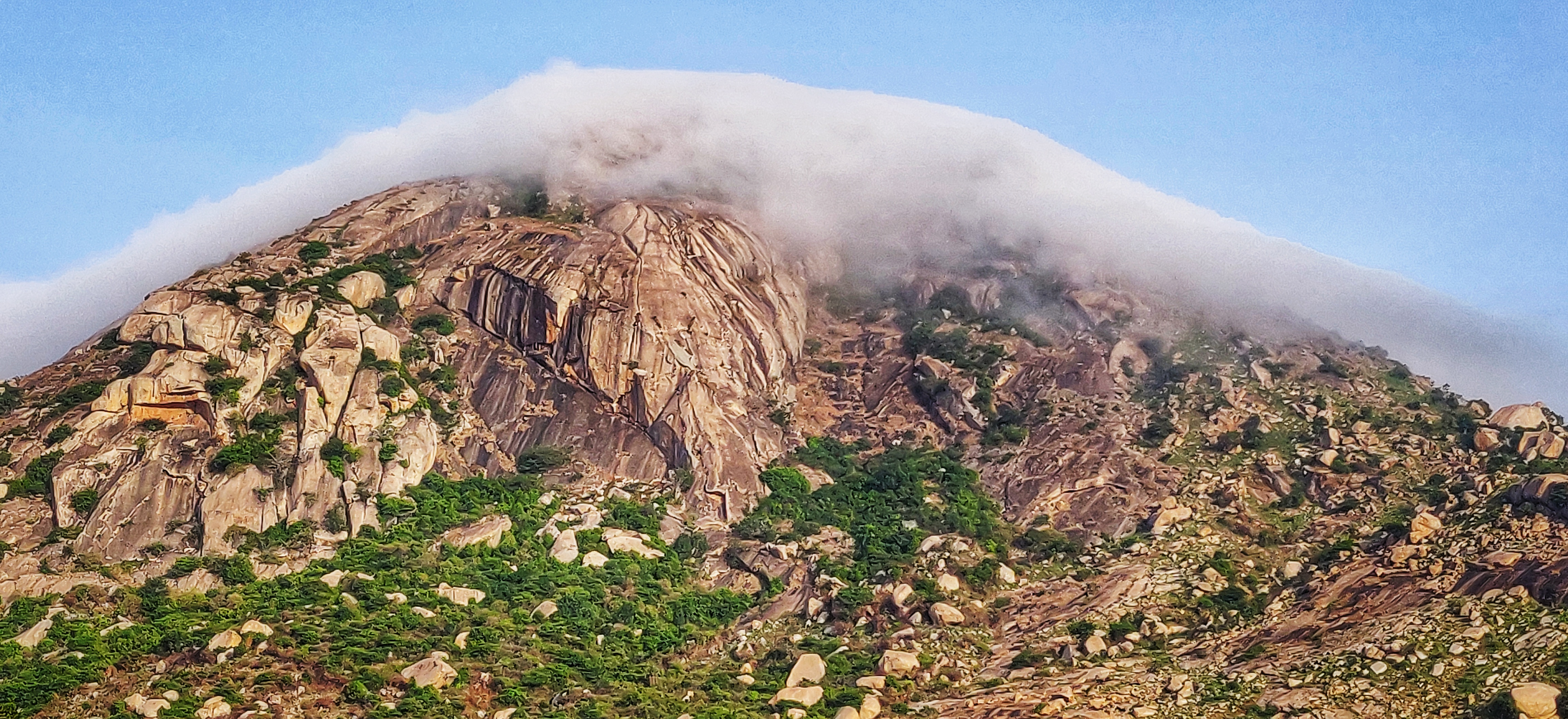
Cloud over Skandagiri, view from Muddenahalli

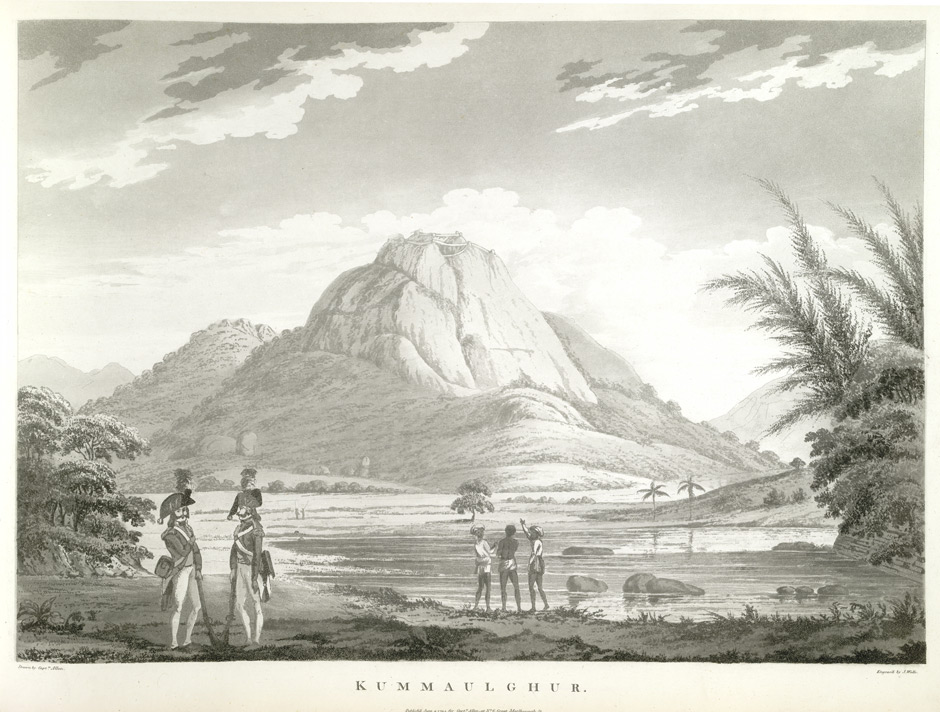
Kummaulghur, as drawn by Alexander Allan ca. 1792
