= Chendia-Todur =

Twin village in Karnataka, India

Chendia-Todur (also spelled Chendiya) is a twin village in the Karwar Taluk of Uttara Kannada District of Karnataka, India.

== Geography ==
=== Location ===
Chendia-Todur lies 13 km south of the city of Karwar, 257 km north of the chief port city Mangalore and 489 km from the state capital Bangalore. The nearby villages are Amdalli (4 km), Shirwad (6 km), and Kadwad (7 km). The surrounding taluks are Ankola Taluk to the east, Canacona Taluk to the north, and Kumta Taluk to the south. Karwar, Curchorem Cacora, Madgaon, and Margao are the nearest cities.

Todur Village is located in Karwar Tehsil of the Uttara Kannada district. It is situated 13km away from Karwar, which is both the district and the sub-district headquarters of Todur Village. Thoduru is the gram panchayat of Todur Village.

The total geographical area of the village is 1430.22 hectares.

=== Climate ===
Since it is near to the Arabian Sea, the weather is warm and humid.

== Demographics ==
The total population is 3,140 people.

=== Languages ===
Kannada and Konkani are the local languages.

== Economy ==
=== Agriculture ===
Cash crops and food crops are grown. Crops include varieties of mangoes: asaid, pairi, neelam, mushral, totapuri, and got.

Chendia-Todur is part of India's strategic Naval Base Sea Bird Project.

== Infrastructure ==
=== Communication ===
The PIN code is 581324 and the postal head office is Chendia.

The location code or village code of Todur Village is 602626.

=== Transport ===
There are roads to the nearby towns of Karwar, Madgaon, Yellapur, and Dandeli. Chendia Village can be reached by bus. There are regular local public and private buses to Karwar and Ankola. The nearest railway station is Karwar. Goa's Dabolim Airport is 87 km from Chendia-Todur.

== Education ==
The New English school is a school in Chendia.
