= Bhoganandishwara Temple =

Hindu temple complex in India

Bhoganandishwara and Arunachaleswara temples complex ಭೋಗ ನಂದೀಶ್ವರ ದೇವಾಲಯ
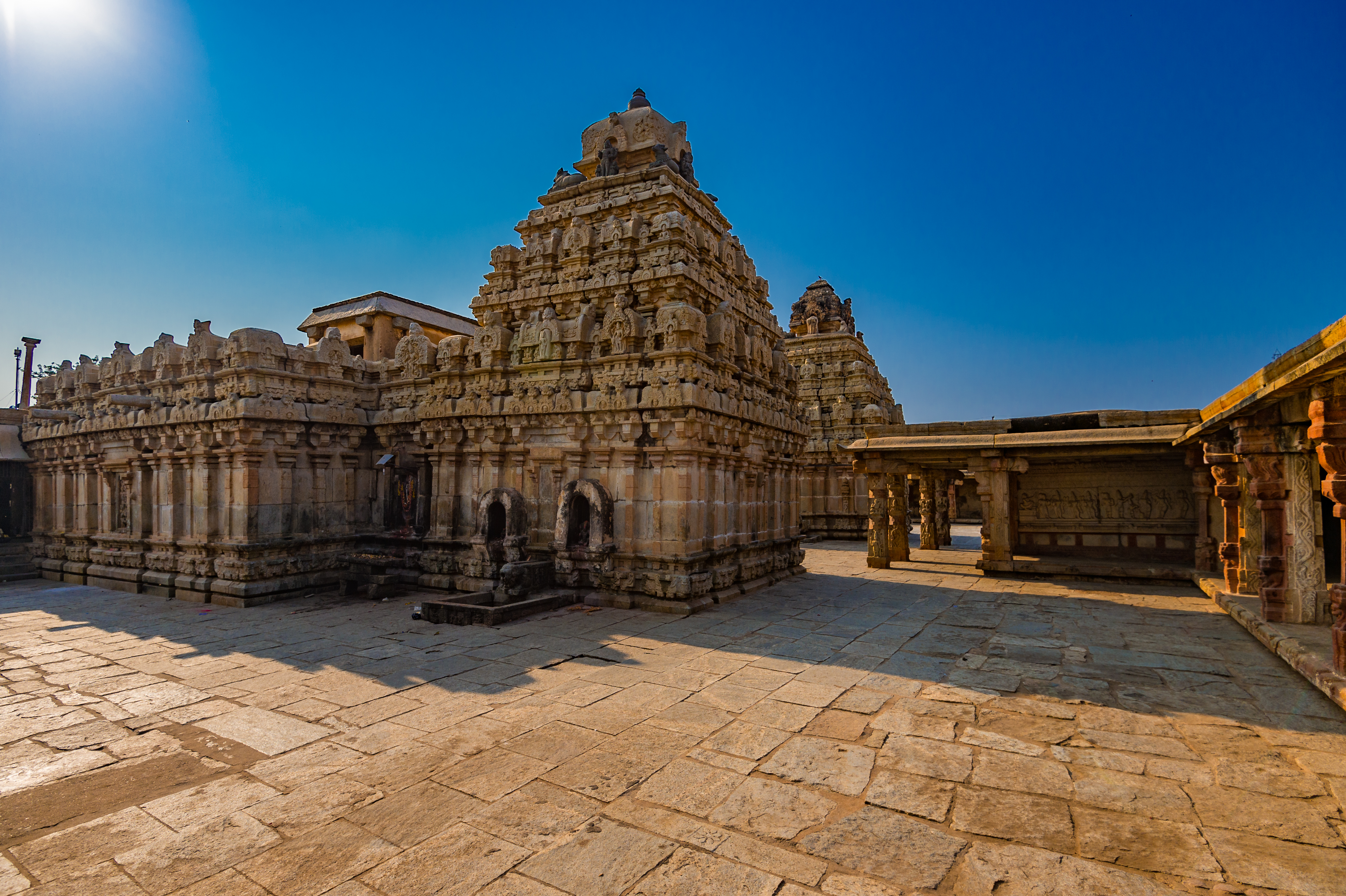
- The north side of the Bhoganandishwara Temple complex

- Location within India Location within Karnataka

Religion
- Affiliation: Hinduism
- District: Chikkaballapura district
- Deity: Shiva

Location
- Location: Nandi (Nandi hills)
- State: Karnataka
- Country: India
- Interactive map of Bhoganandishwara and Arunachaleswara temples complex ಭೋಗ ನಂದೀಶ್ವರ ದೇವಾಲಯ
- Coordinates: 13°23′12″N 77°41′53″E

Architecture
- Creator: Nolamba
- Completed: 700 years ago

Bhoganandiswara Temple and Arunachaleswara Temple are a twin Hindu temples complex located in Nandi village in Chikkaballapur district of Karnataka, India. Ornate, beautifully carved and dedicated to Shiva, they have been variously dated between the 9th- to 10th-century CE.

The Bhoganandiswara is the northern temple of the twin. It is the oldest surviving temple in Nolambavadi-style of Dravidian architecture in Karnataka. The Arunachaleswara temple was added to its south shortly thereafter. The complex underwent restorations and additions through the Chola Empire period. The temples are notable for its large and intricately carved sabha-mandapa, the inscriptions, and artwork, much of it to Shaivism, but also significantly for Vaishnavism (Narasimha, Vishnu), Shaktism (Durga, Lakshmi) and Vedic deities (Surya, Agni).

The temple is protected and managed as a monument of national importance by the Archaeological Survey of India.

== Location ==
Nandi village is located at the base of Nandi Hills (or Nandidurga). It is 8 kilometres (5 mi) southwest from Chikkaballapur town, and about 55 kilometres (34 mi) northeast from Bengaluru city, the capital of Karnataka.

== History ==
The history of the eastern regions of south Karnataka traces to ancient times. They developed under the reign of the Rashtrakuta and Ganga dynasties. By the 8th-century, the Hindu Nolambas – also known as Nolamba-Pallavas – were governing this region for the Rashtrakuta and Ganga dynasties. The reign of Mahendra I (860–895 CE) brought renewed powers and economic prosperity after he defeated the Banas. After the death of Mahendra I, his mother Devalabbarasi came to power assisted by her second son Iriva-Nolamba. She was great patron of arts, used the epithet Nolamba for her sons, and she built the Nolamba-Narayanesvara temple. The style that emerged from these period (850–1000 CE) reflects a synthesis of regional Hindu arts, and is now called the Nolambavadi style.

Early 9th-century inscriptions found near Nandi village refer to a temple for Shiva. However, these inscriptions do not mention this temple complex. According to the Archaeological Survey of India, these inscriptions can be attributed to the Nolamba dynasty ruler Nolambadiraja and the Rashtrakuta emperor Govinda III, and they date from c. 806 and 810 CE. Copper plate inscriptions found about 10 kilometers away near Chikkaballapur refer to the wife of Bana Vidhyadhara making a gift to the temple. These are indirect references, as they do not specifically mention either of the two large twin temples. Based on architecture and iconography, the Bhoganandiswara and the Arunachaleswara temples are dated to no later than the 10th-century and no earlier than the 9th-century.

The temple was later under the patronage of successive notable South Indian dynasties, and they have all contributed to the form that has survived into the modern era: the Ganga Dynasty, the Hoysala Empire and the Vijayanagara Empire.

== Structure ==
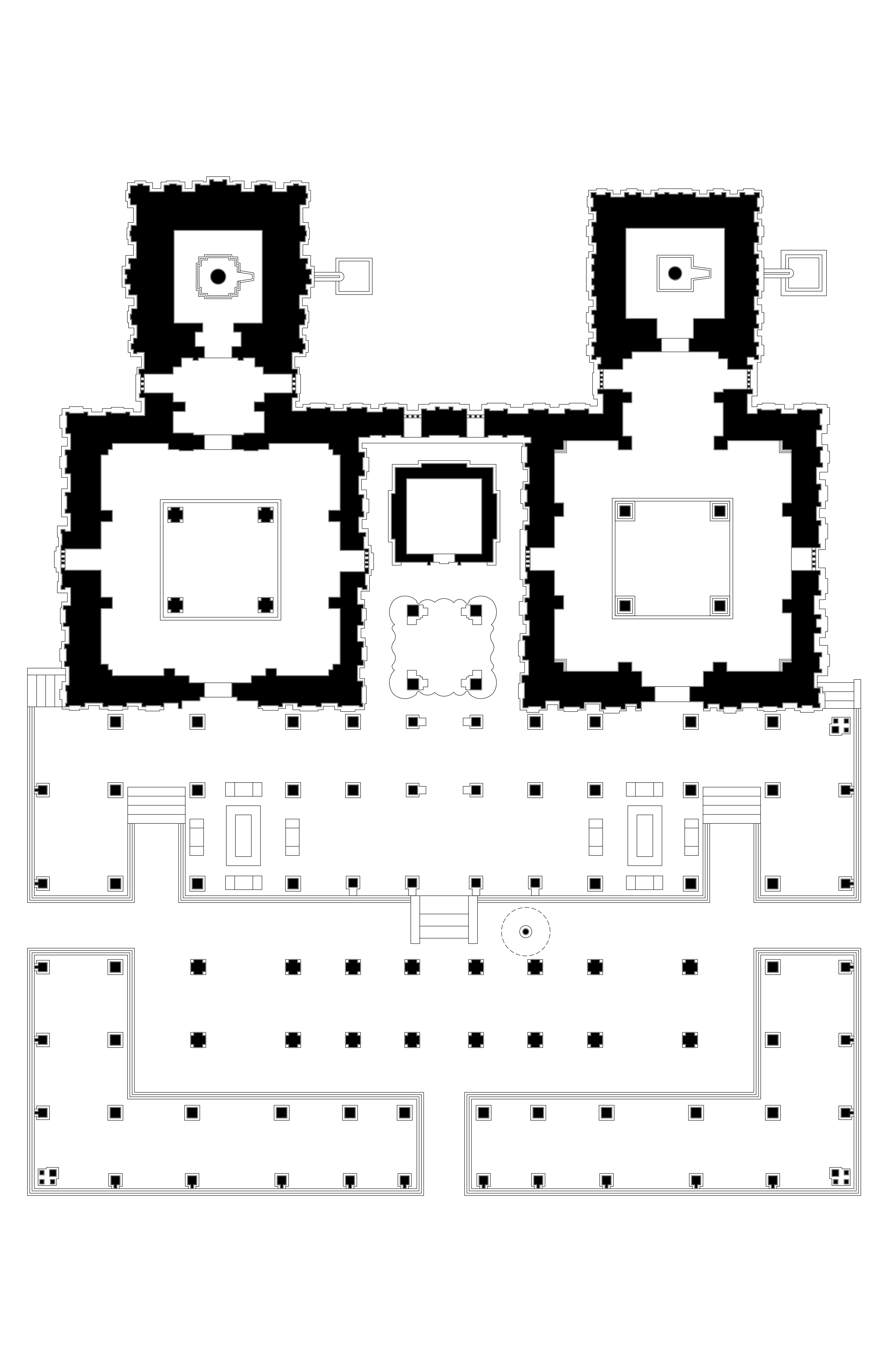
Floor plan of the Bhoganandiswara and Arunachaleswara twin temples

The temple complex has two large shrines: the Bhoganandiswara and the Arunachaleswara temples. They have very similar architecture, but not exactly the same. The "Arunachaleswara" shrine to the south of the two is newer and has a slightly more complex artwork. Both share a large courtyard and open sabha-mandapa. Each has a navaranga, an antarala, a sukanasi, a garbhagriha and a Dravida-style vimana. The vestibule and hall are provided with perforated stone screens called Jali. Each shrine has a nandi mantapa in front (hall with the sculptured image of Nandi the bull) facing the sanctum.

In between the twin temples is a small intervening shrine called the "Uma-Maheshwara" shrine with a kalyana mantapa ("marriage alter") supported by ornate pillars in black stone with reliefs depicting of the Hindu gods Shiva and his consort Parvati, Brahma and Saraswathi, Vishnu and Lakshmi, the Vedic god of fire Agni and Swaha Devi. In front is a meticulously carved black stone kalyana-mandapa with decorative creepers and birds, one that "excels beyond those found in later era Hoysala temples", according to ASI.

According to the art historian George Michell, the temple is a typical 9th–10th century Nolamba construction with pilasters on the outer walls of the shrines, perforated decorative stone windows which contain figures, of a dancing Shiva (south wall of the Arunachaleshwara shrine) and Durga standing on a buffalo head (north wall of Bhoga Nandeshwara shrine). Pyramidal and tiered towers (shikhara) rise from the two major shrines. Each major shrine has a large linga in the sanctum (the universal symbol of the god Shiva) with a sculpture of Nandi (the bull) in a pavilion facing the shrine. According to Michell, during the 16th century Vijayanagara period, a pavilion with elegant pillars was added in between the two major shrines. The pillars crafted out of grey-green granite have relief sculptures of attendant maidens. Michell feels the minor "Uma-Maheshwara" shrine was added in between the two major shrines (behind the pavilion) during the post Vijayanagara rule of the Gowdas of the Yelahanka dynasty. The minor shrine has a procession of deities and sages in wall relief. The wall that links the two major shrines was cleverly constructed so as to be in-distinguishable from the two original shrines. A spacious pillared hall was also added in front of the two major shrines.

Other monuments in the complex

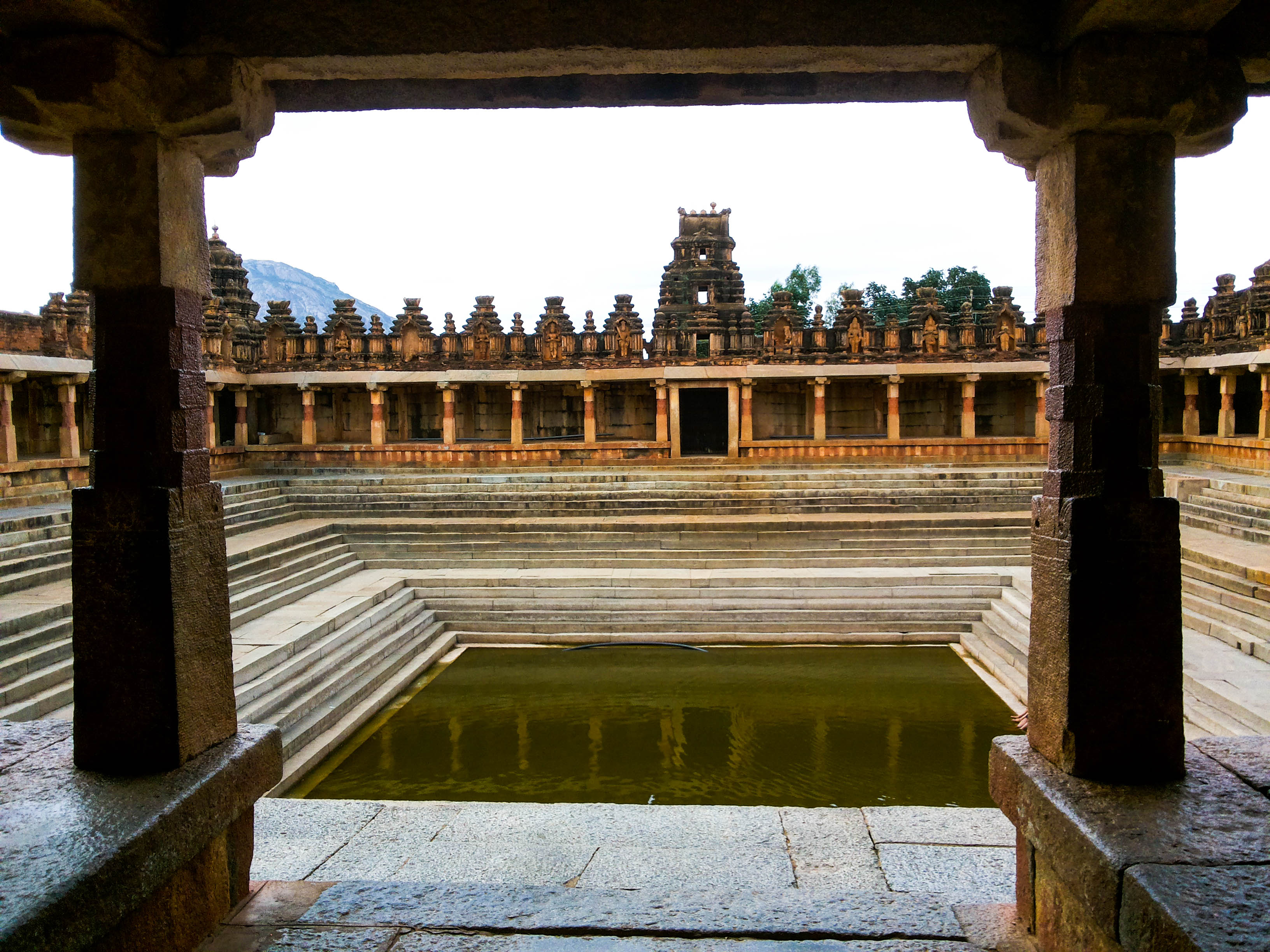
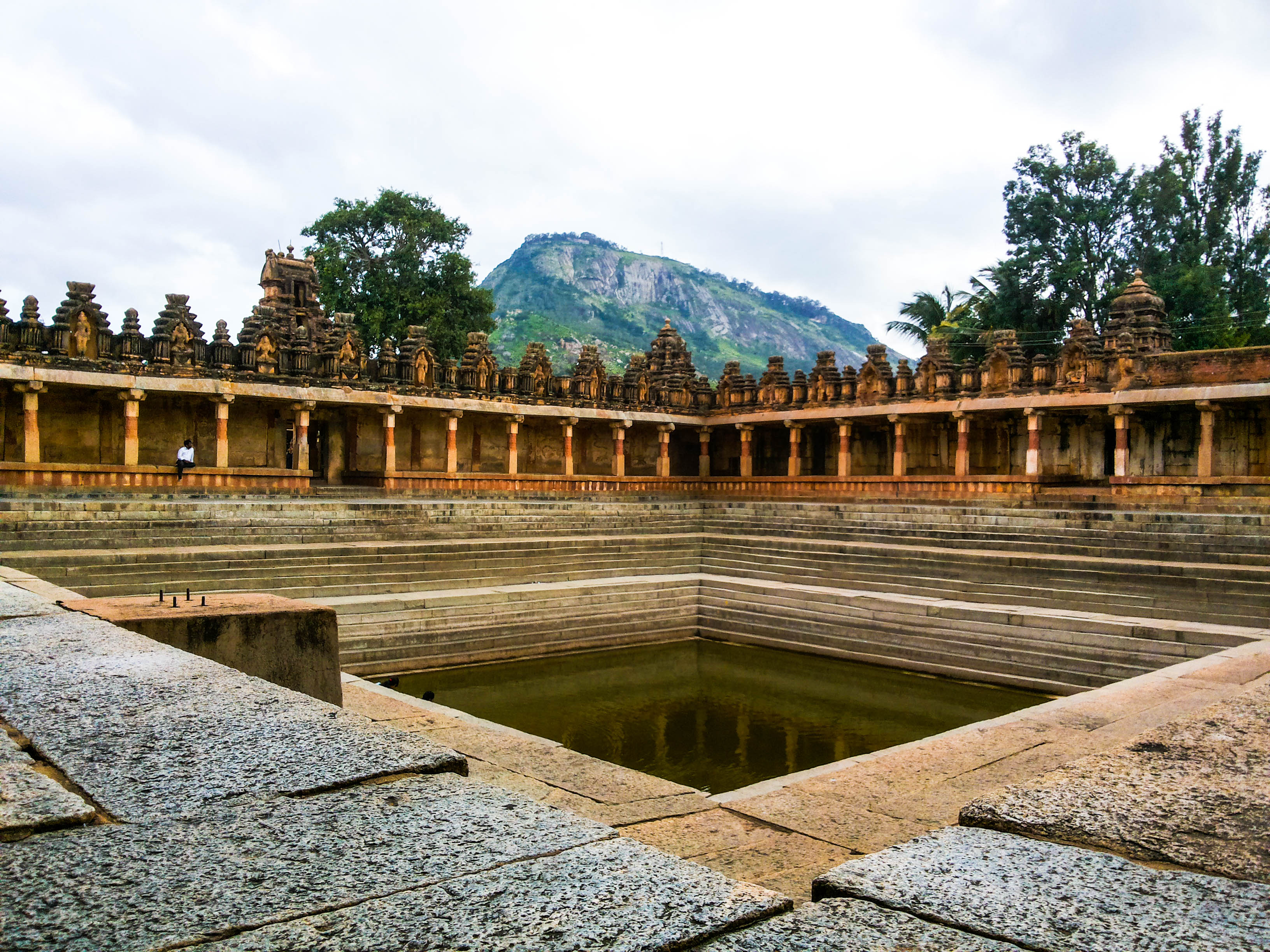
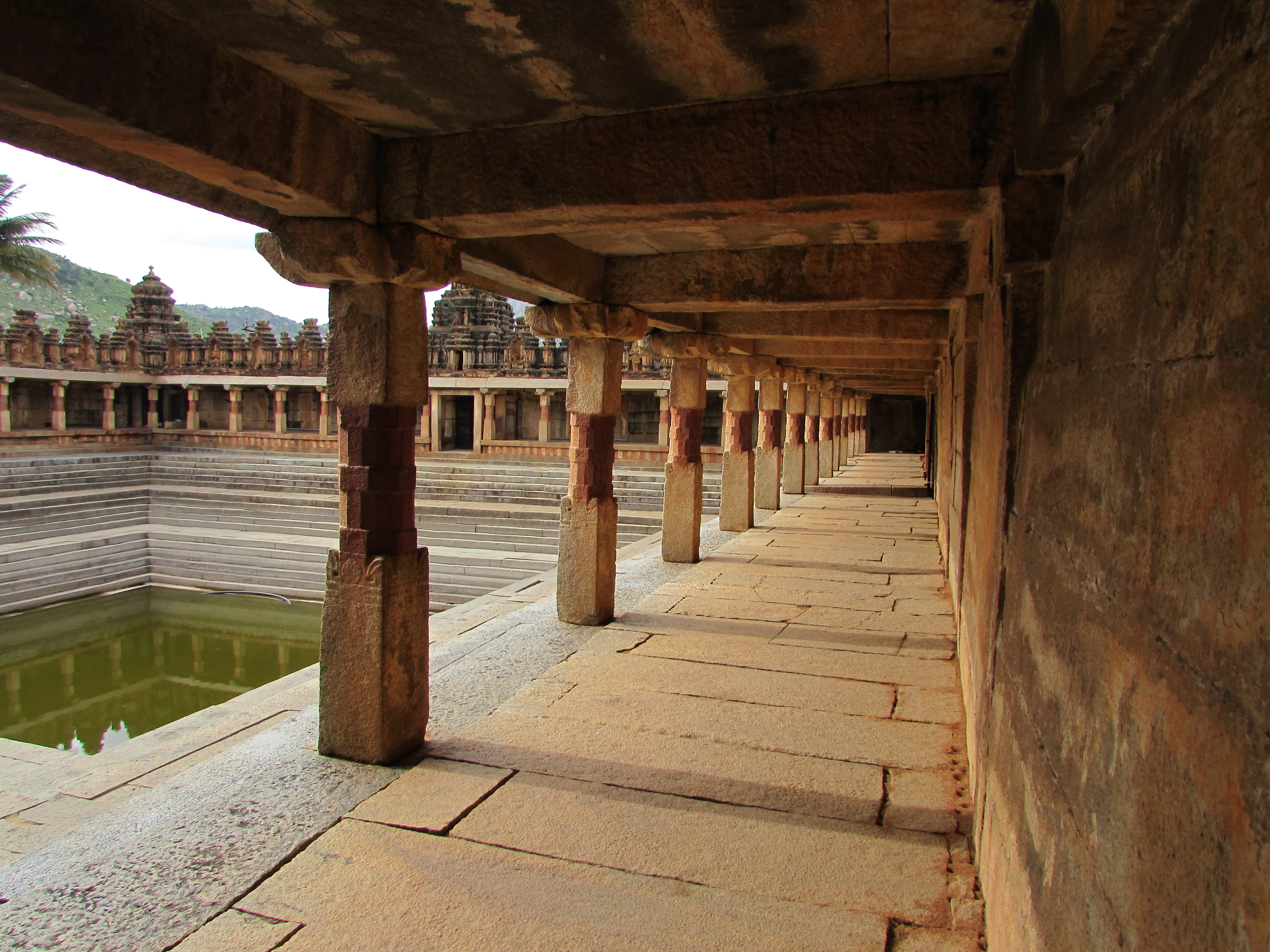
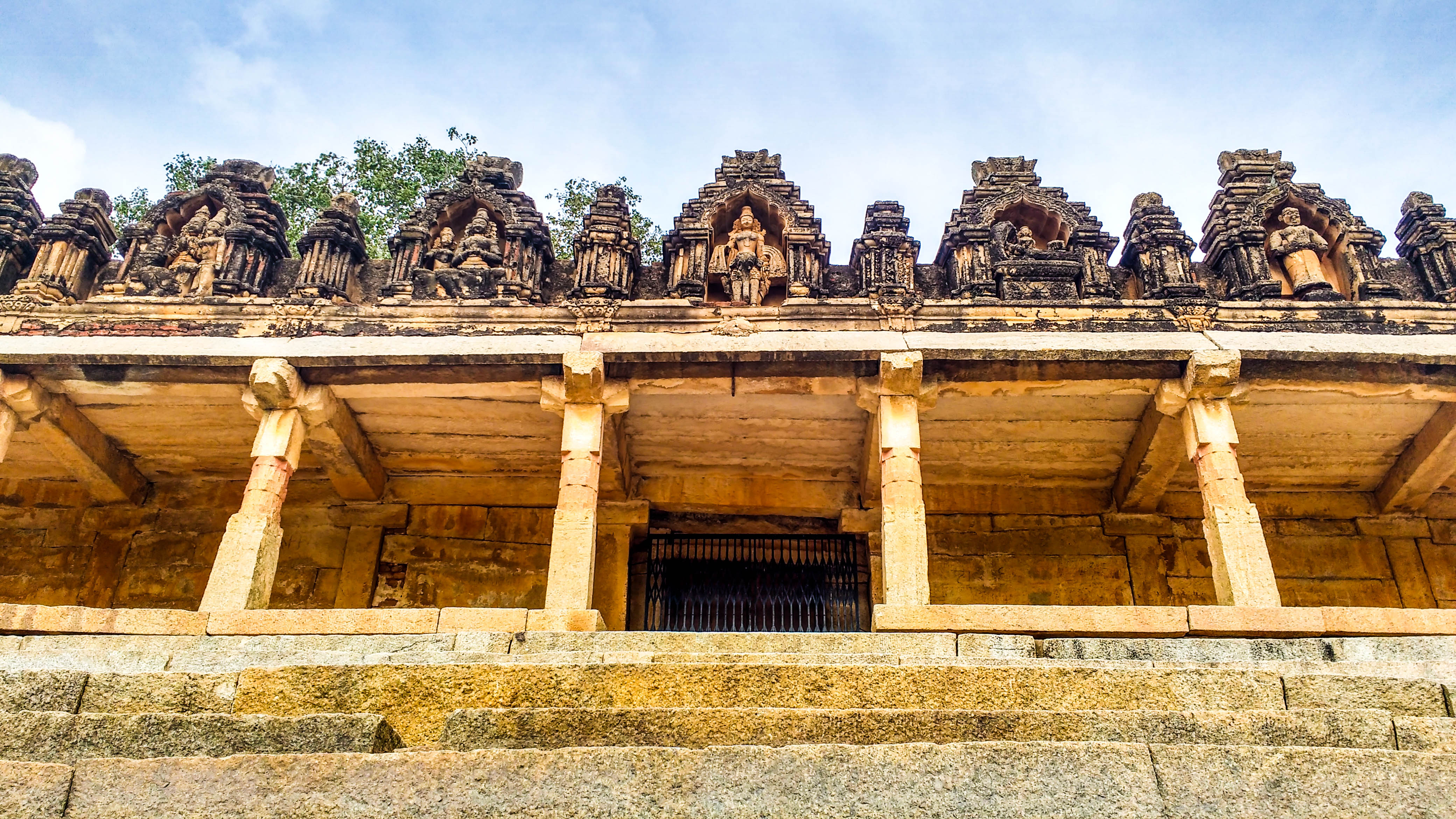
Kalyani (temple tank), added during the Vijayanagara era

The outer bounding wall (prakara) of the complex has two smaller goddess shrines of the Shakti tradition. To the north of the shrines is a second compound with a navaranga mantapa (pavilion) with Yali pillars. Beyond this compound is a large stepped temple tank (kalyani or pushkarni), locally called "Sringeri Teertha" (the mythical source of the Pinakini river) where lamps are lit on certain festive days.

Popularity

The Uma-Maheshwara shrine has reliefs depicting Shiva's marriage to the goddess Parvati. Hence this shrine is popular with newly weds who come to seek blessing.

== Gallery ==
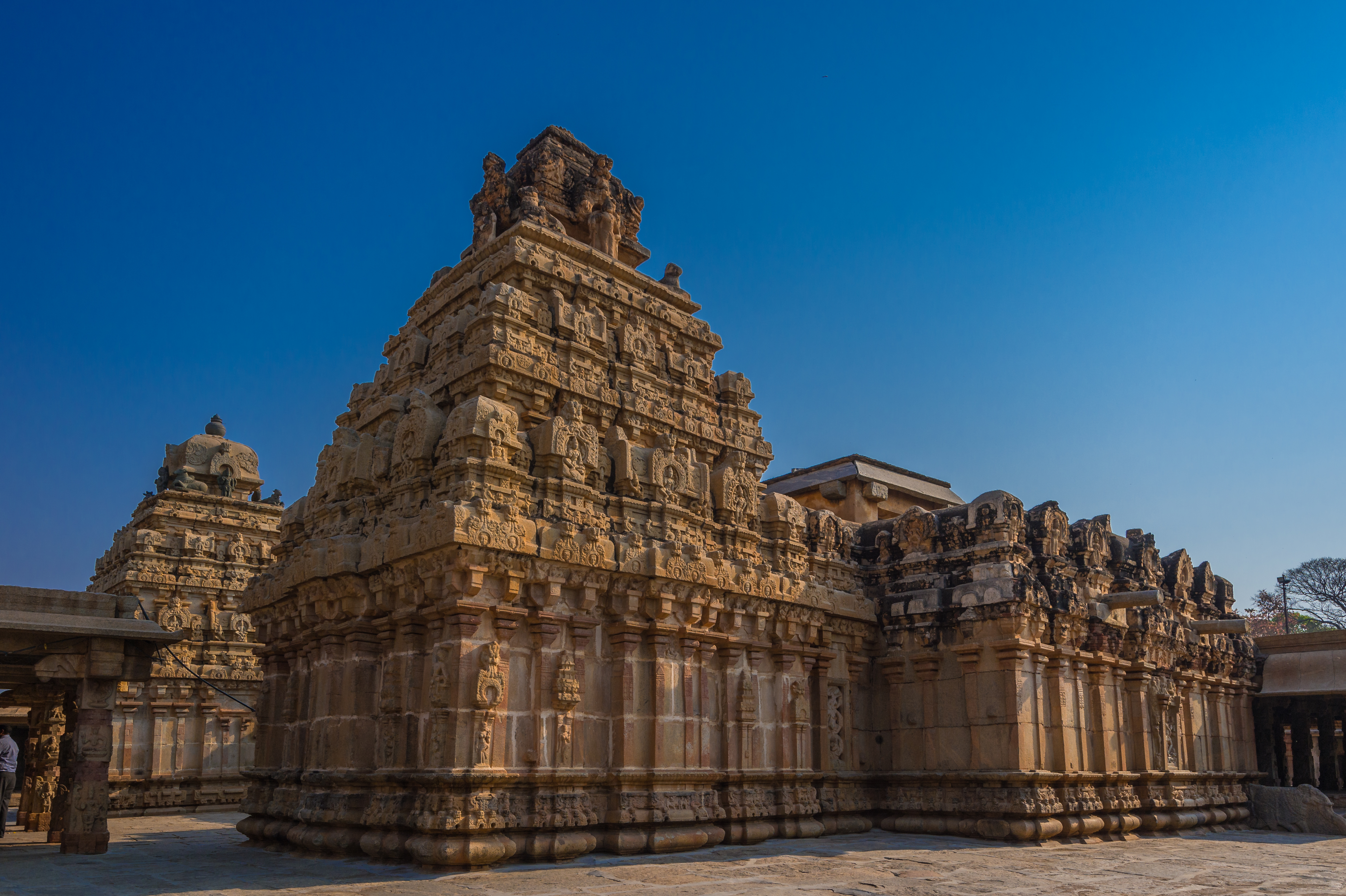
The south side of the Bhoganandishwara Temple complex

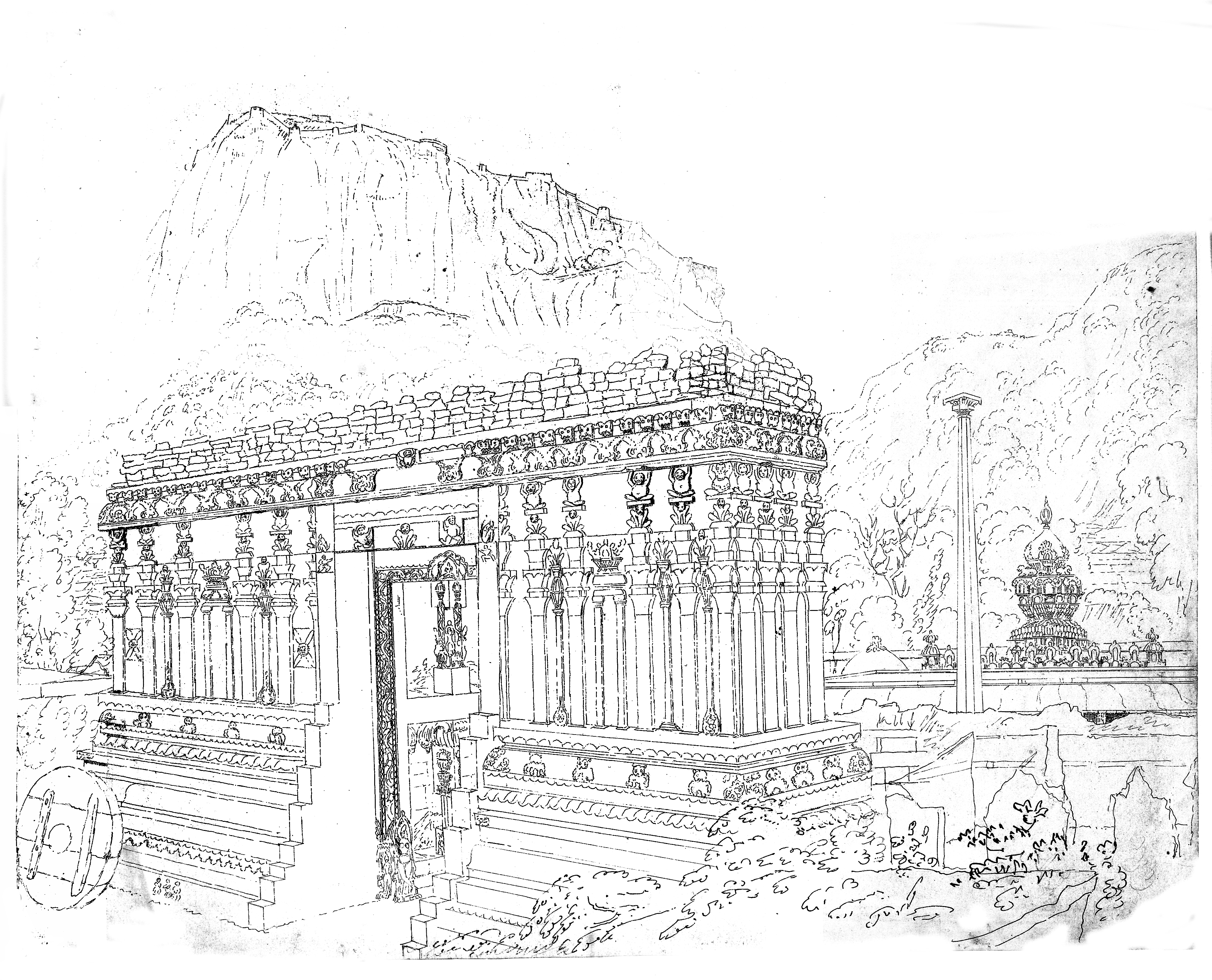
Entrance as seen in 1834

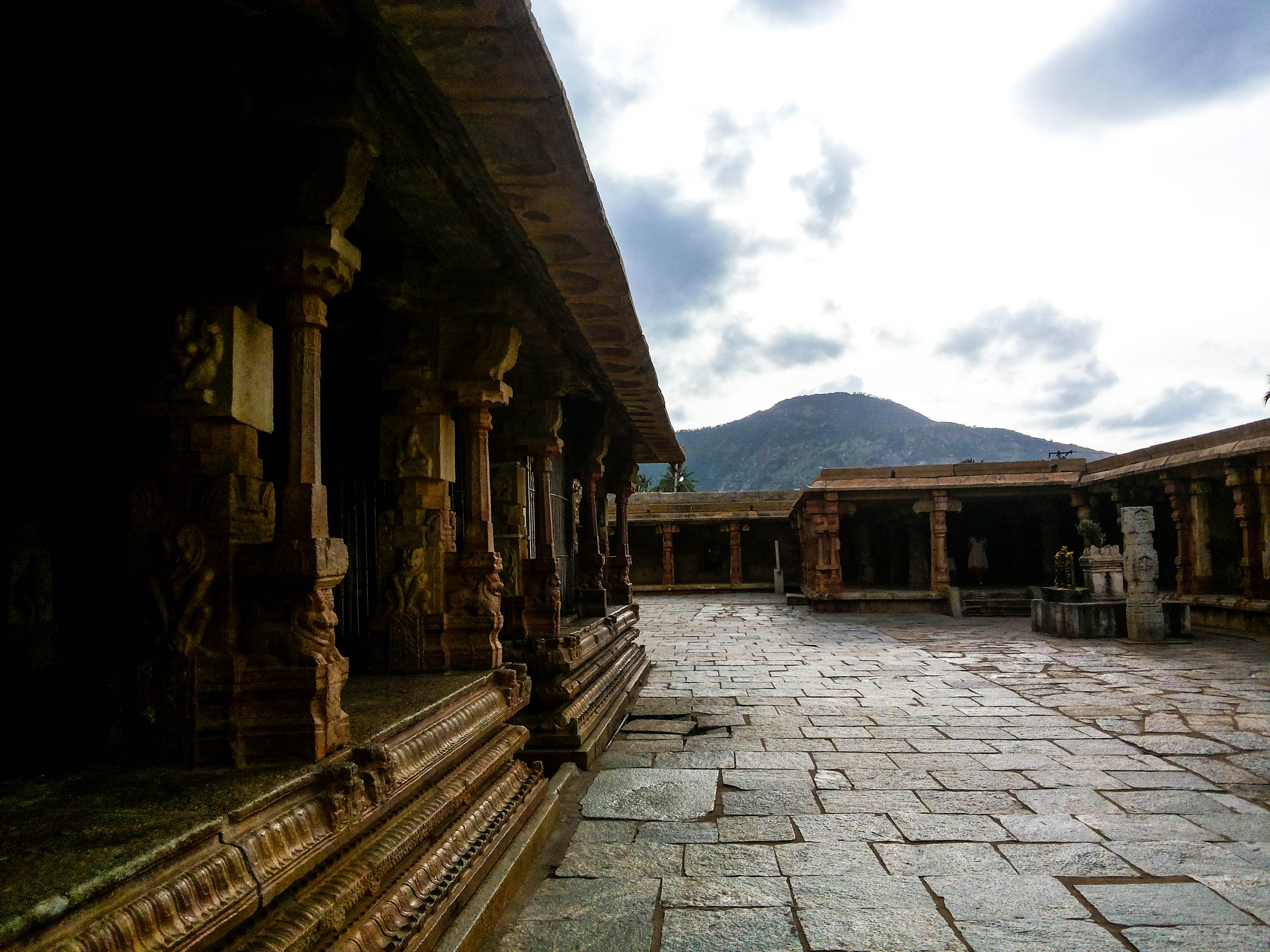
Main shrine and courtyard of the 9th-century Bhoga Nandeeshwara Temple

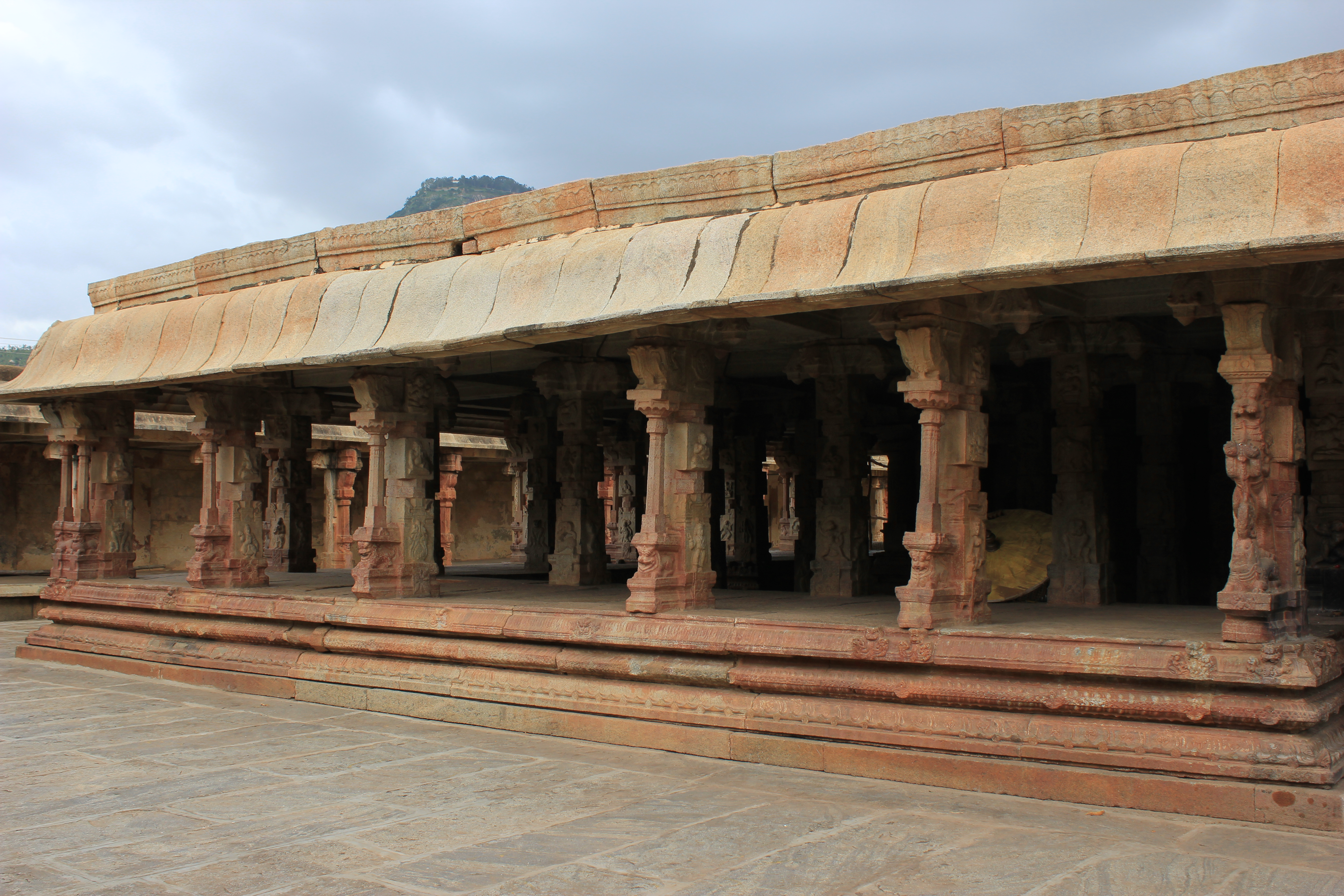
View of the large Maha mantapa (main hall), a Vijayanagara Empire era construction at the Bhoga Nandeeshvara temple complex

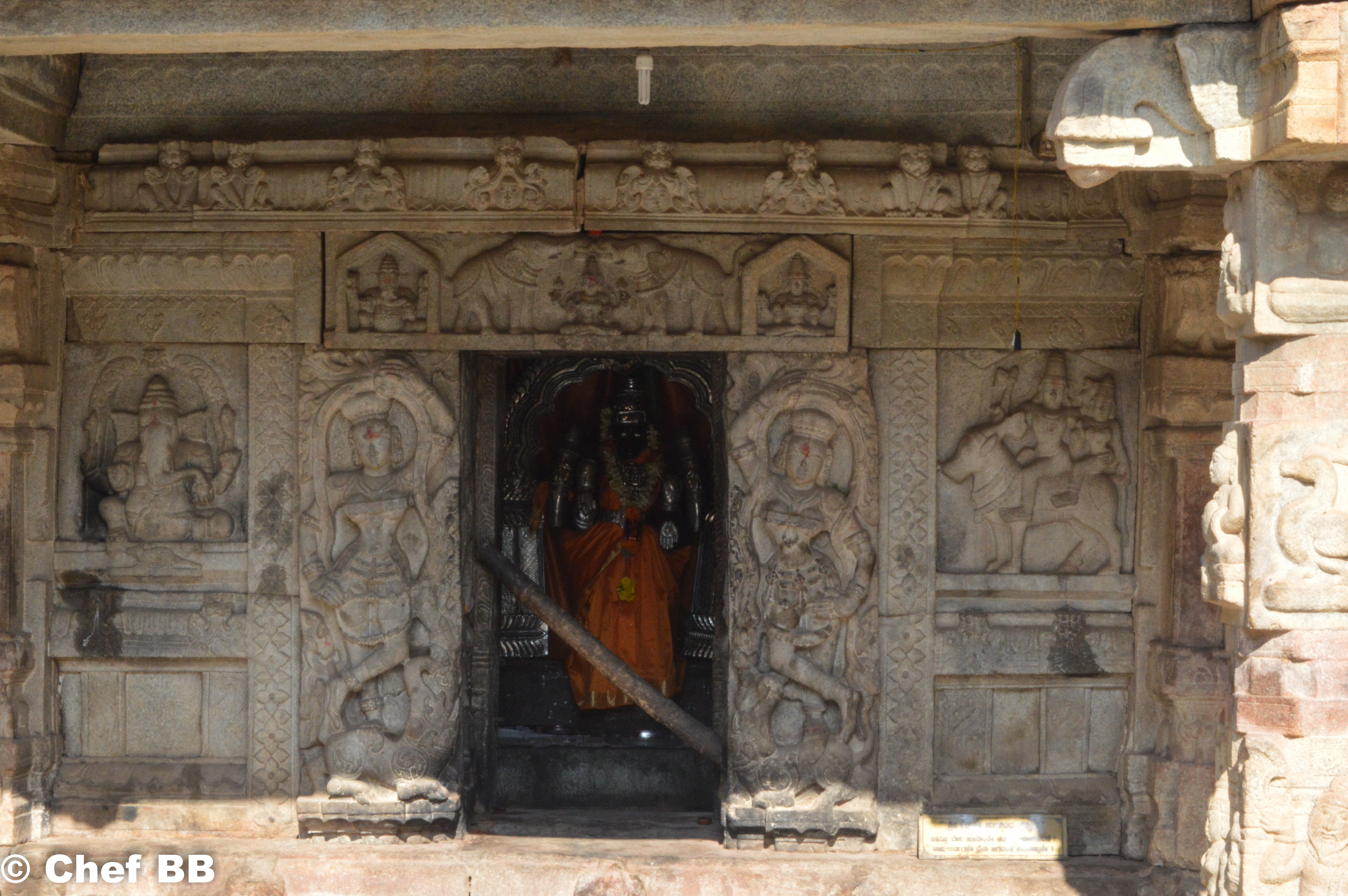
Parvati shrine in the temple complex

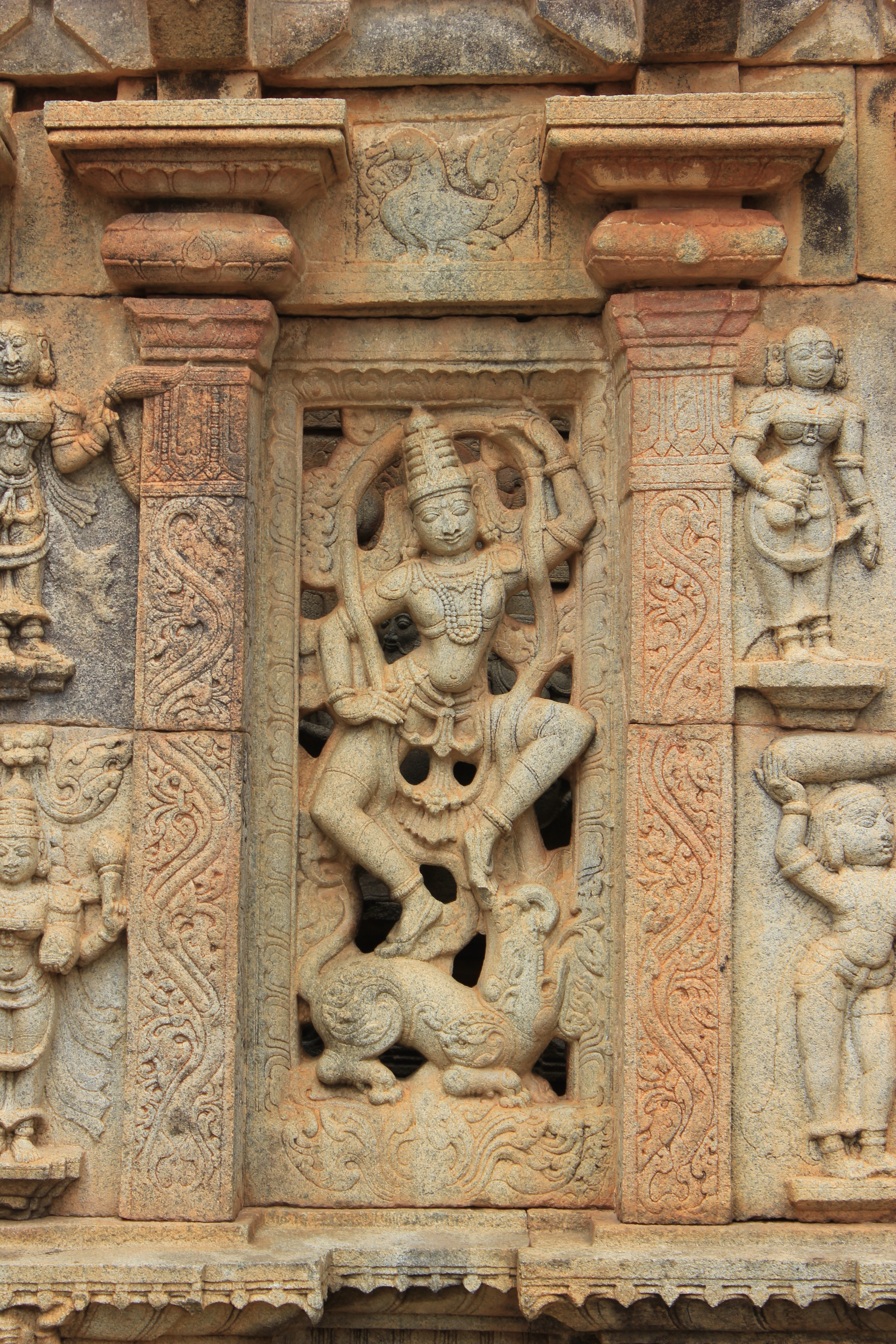
Window art and relief work at the Bhoganandeeshvara temple complex

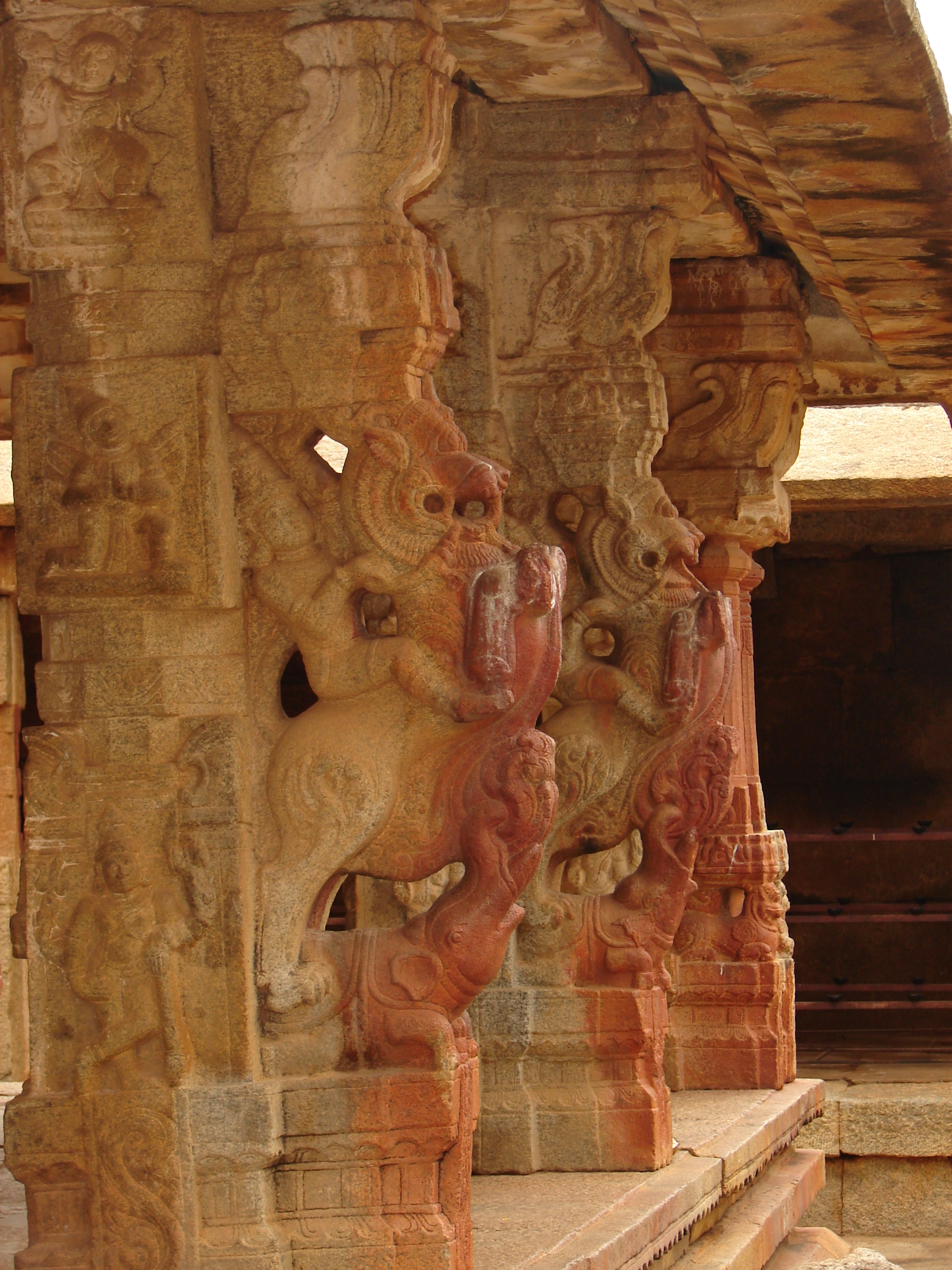
Yali pillars in the vasantha mantapa, a Vijayanagara era addition at Bhoga Nandeeshvara temple complex

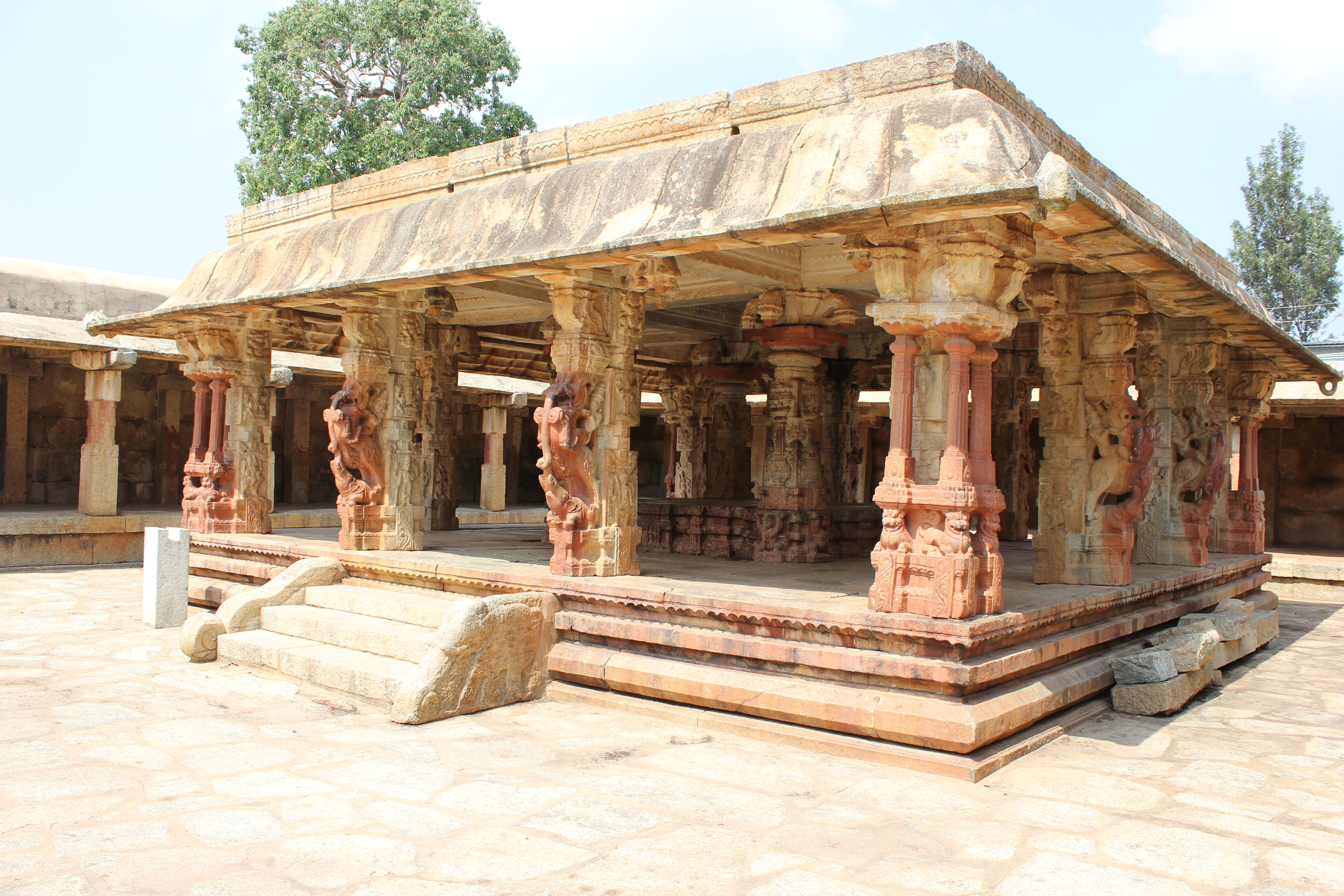
Vasantha mantapa ("marriage alter") is a Vijayanagara era contribution to the Bhoga Nandeeshwara temple complex

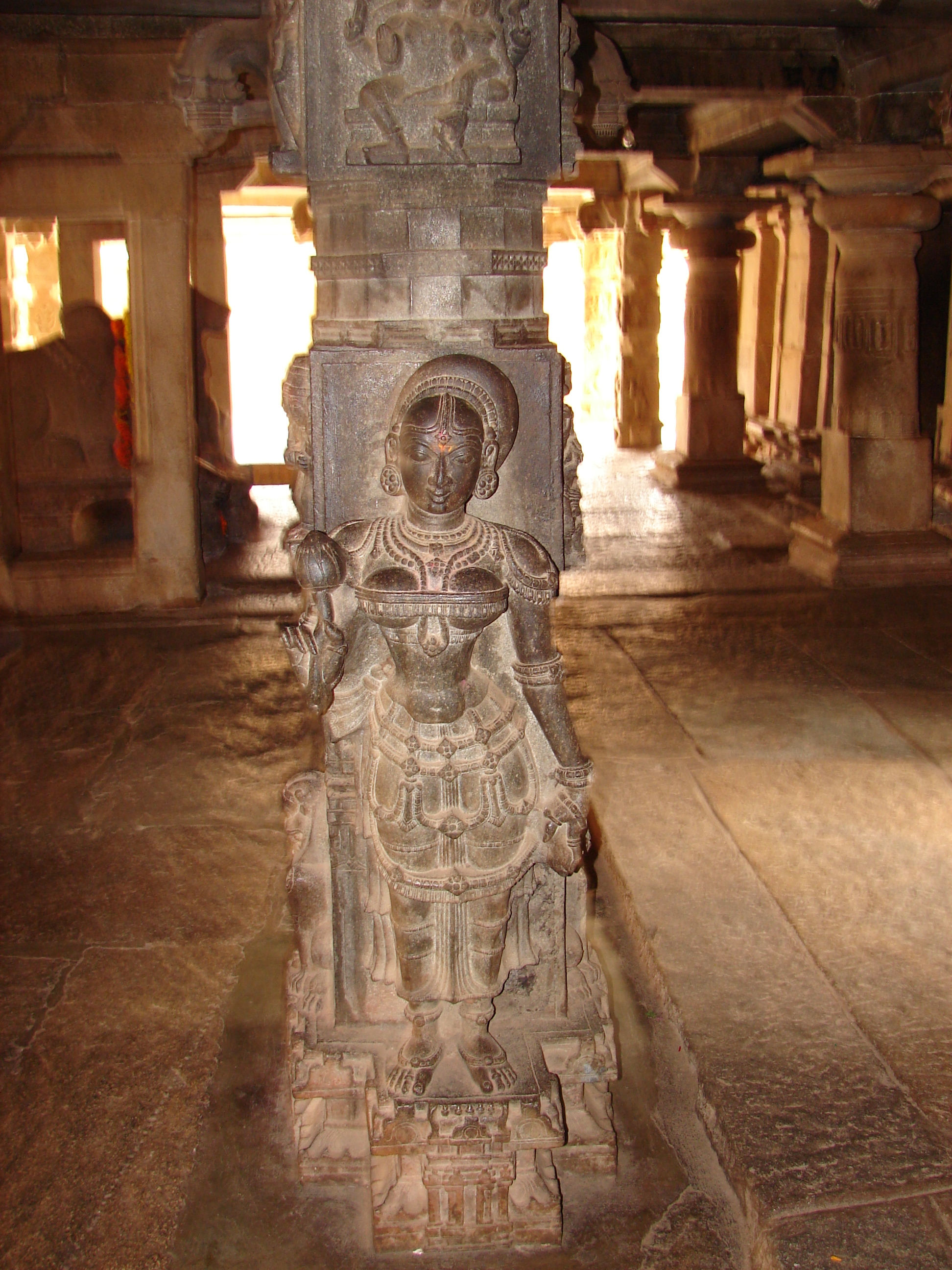
Ornate pillar in the large open mantapa is a Vijayanagara era addition to the Bhoga Nandeeshvara temple complex

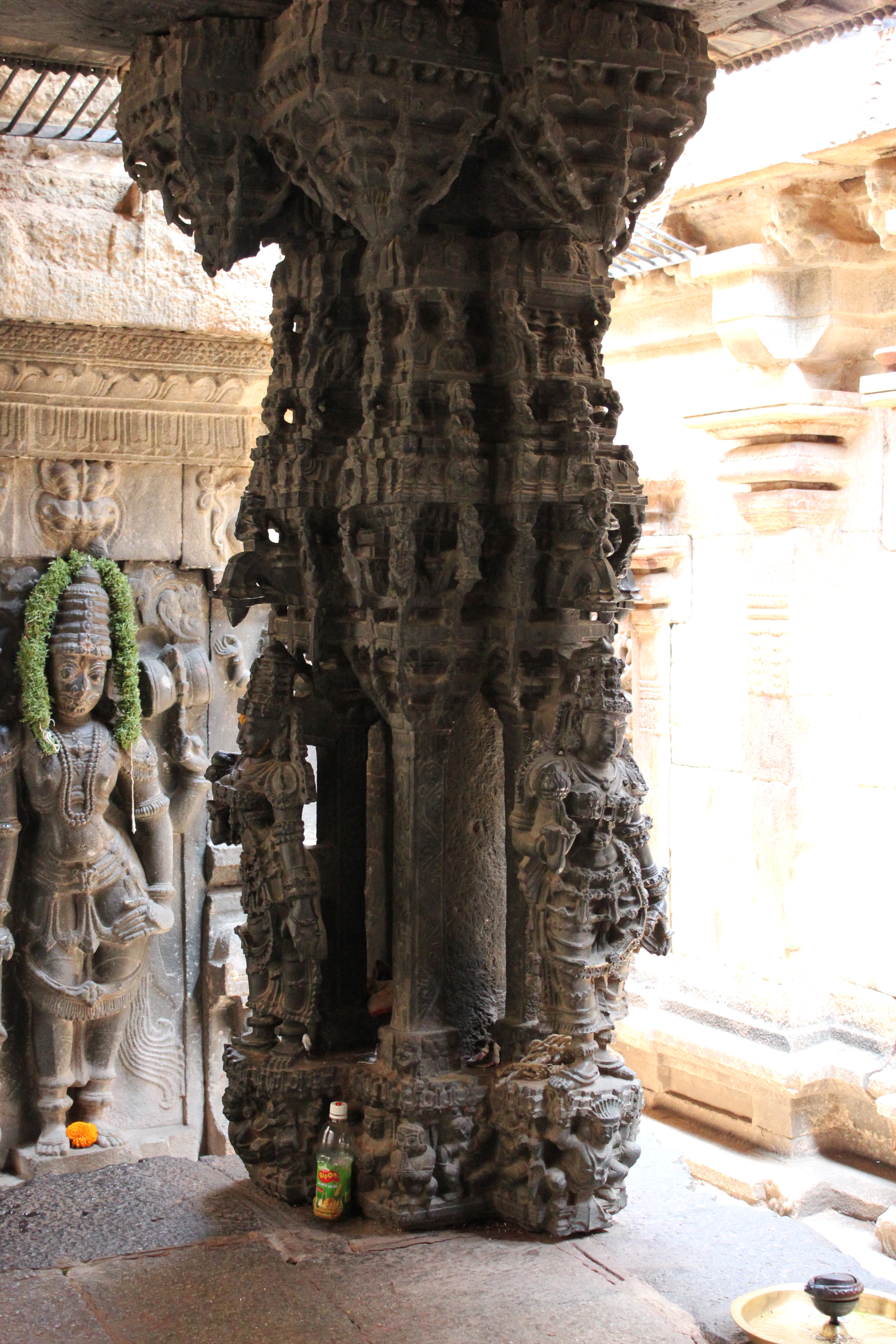
Ornate pillar of the vasanta mantapa, made of soap stone, is a Hoysala era contribution

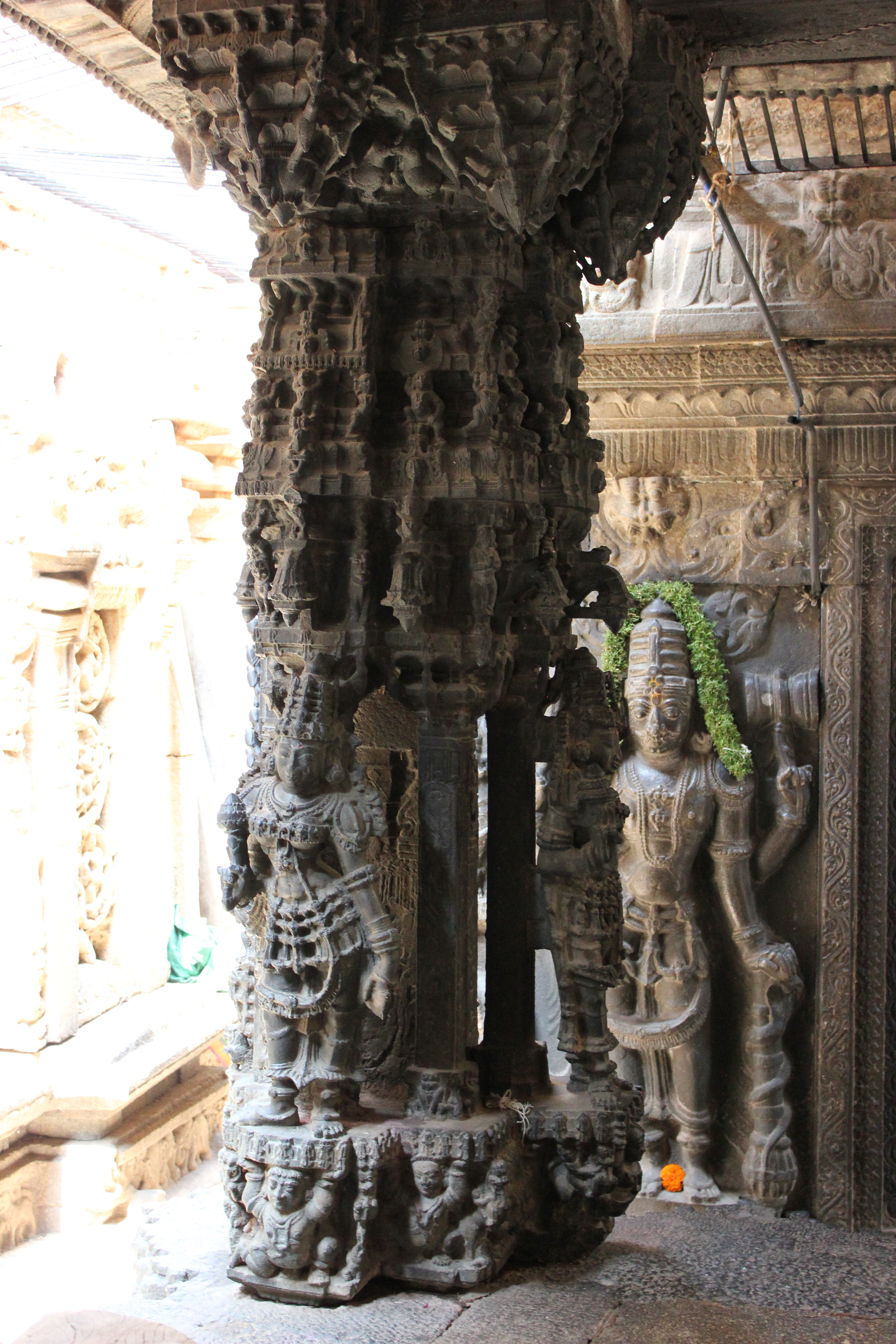
Ornate pillar of the vasanta mantapa, made of soap stone, is a Hoysala era contribution

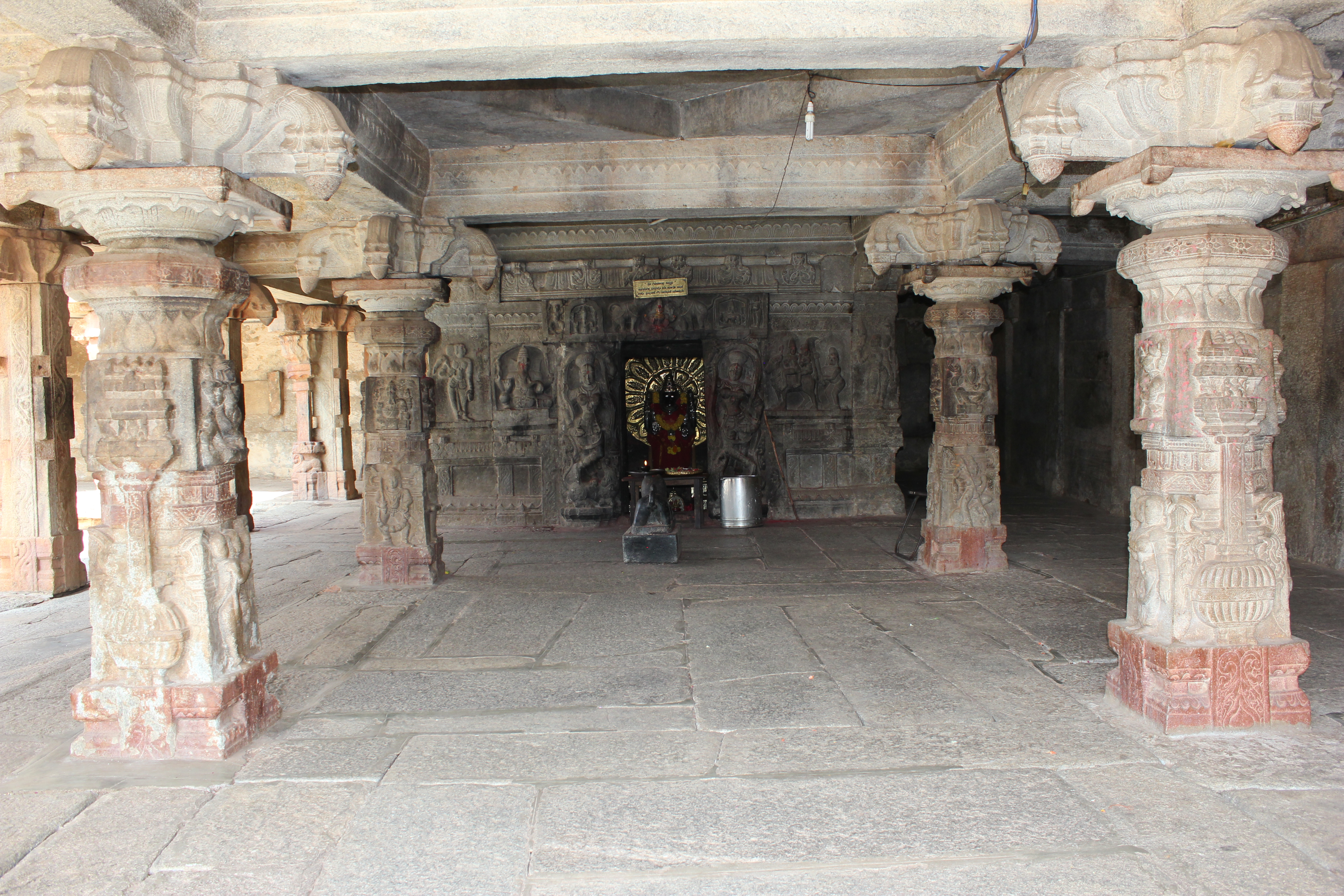
Open mantapa facing a minor shrine at the rear in the Bhoga Nandeeshwara temple complex

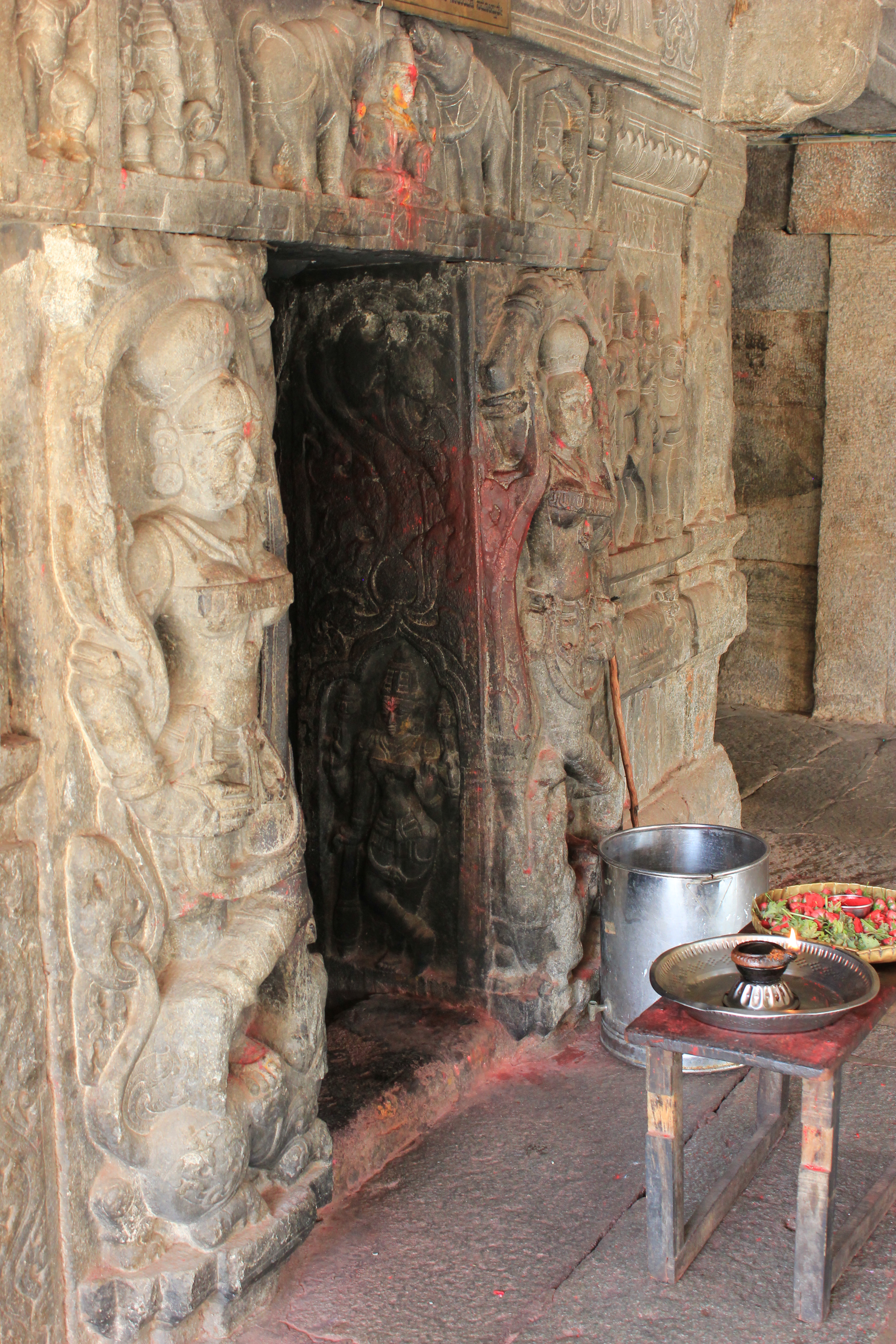
Entrance to minor shrine at the rear in the Bhoga Nandeeshwara temple complex

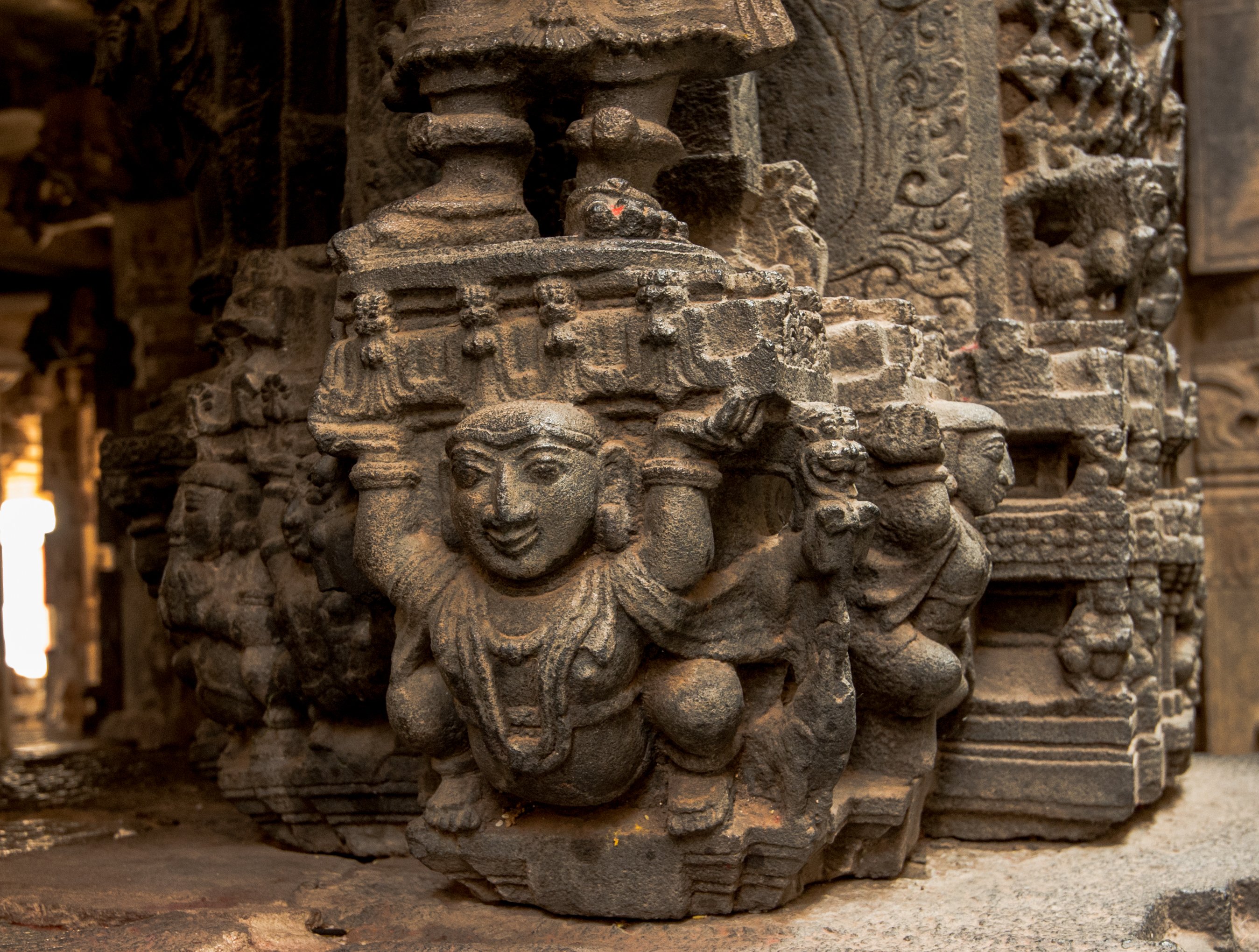
Ornate Pillar carvings of the Vasantha Mantapa

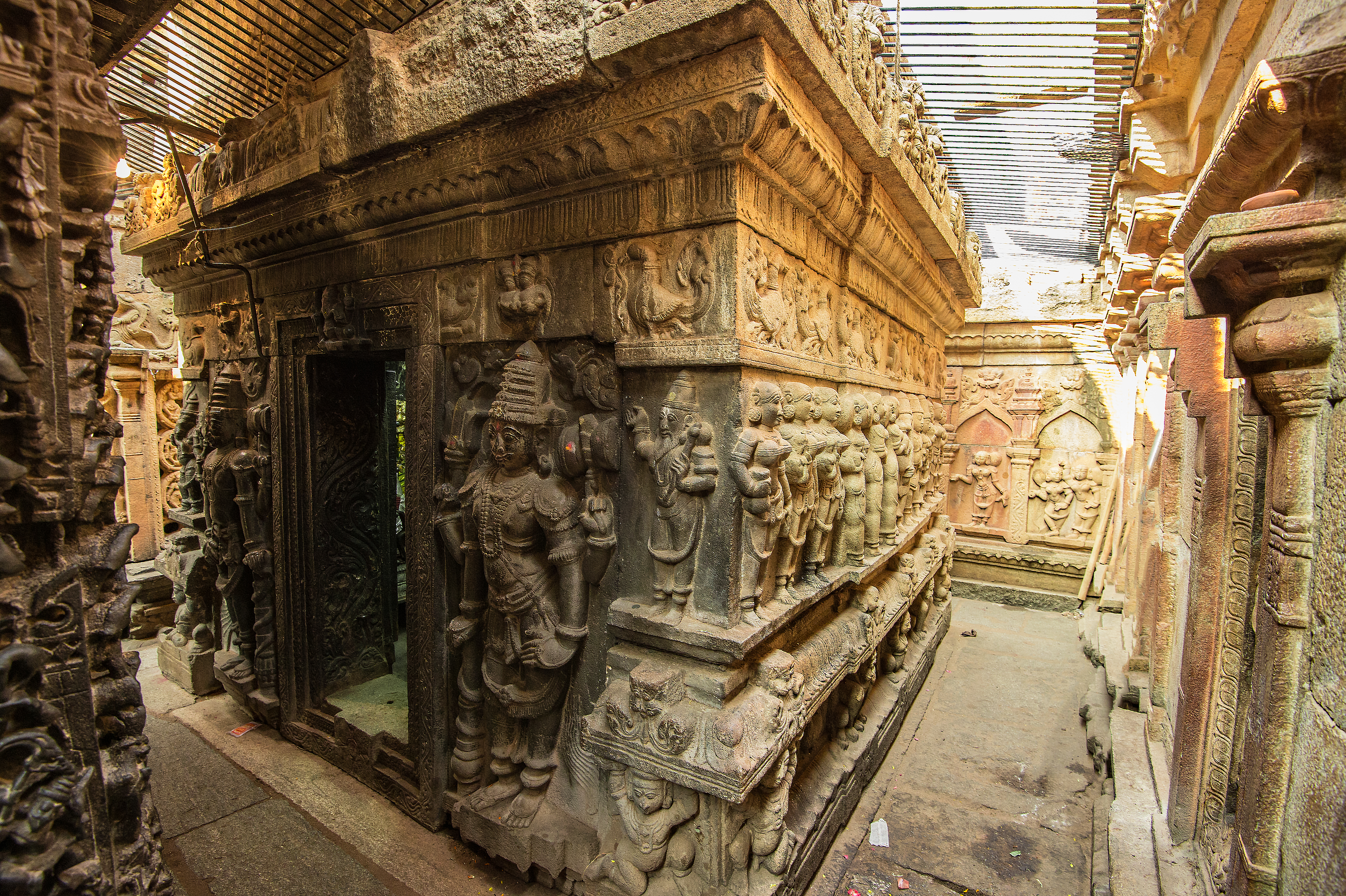
Ornate Carvings on the Uma-Maheshswara Shrine

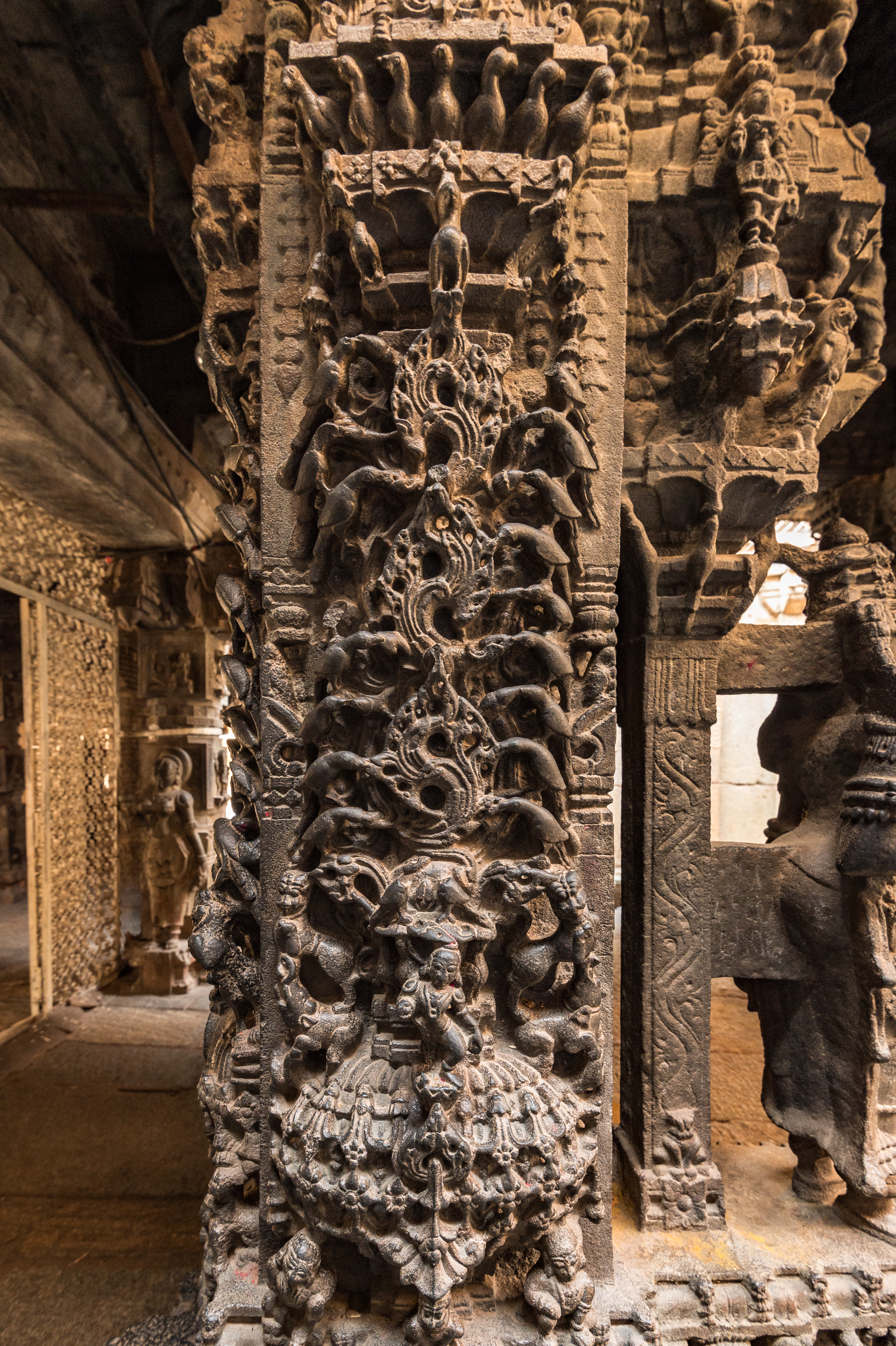
Ornated pillar of Vasanta Mantap

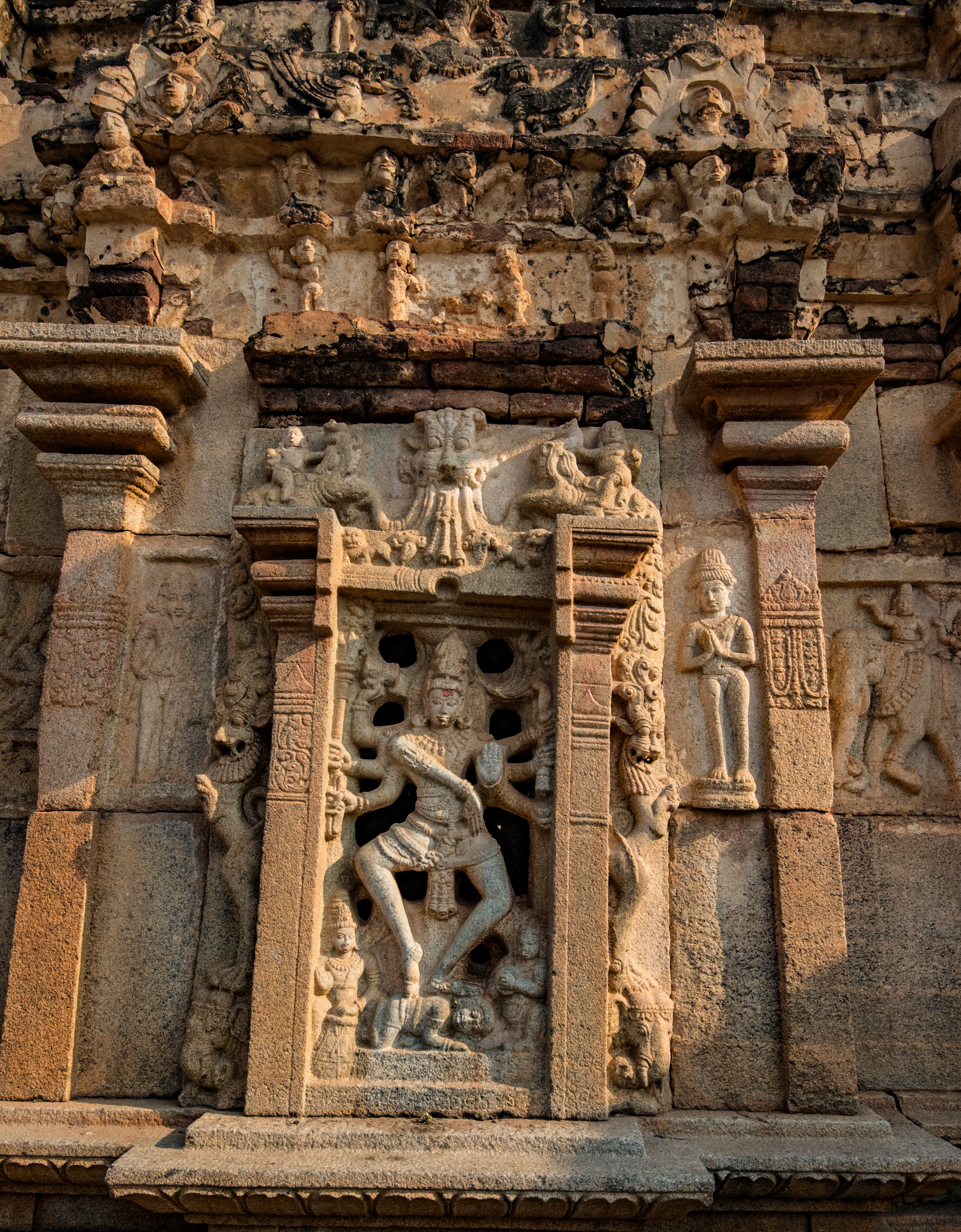
Window carving on outerwall of the Arunachaleshswara shrine in the Bhoga Nandeeshvara temple complex

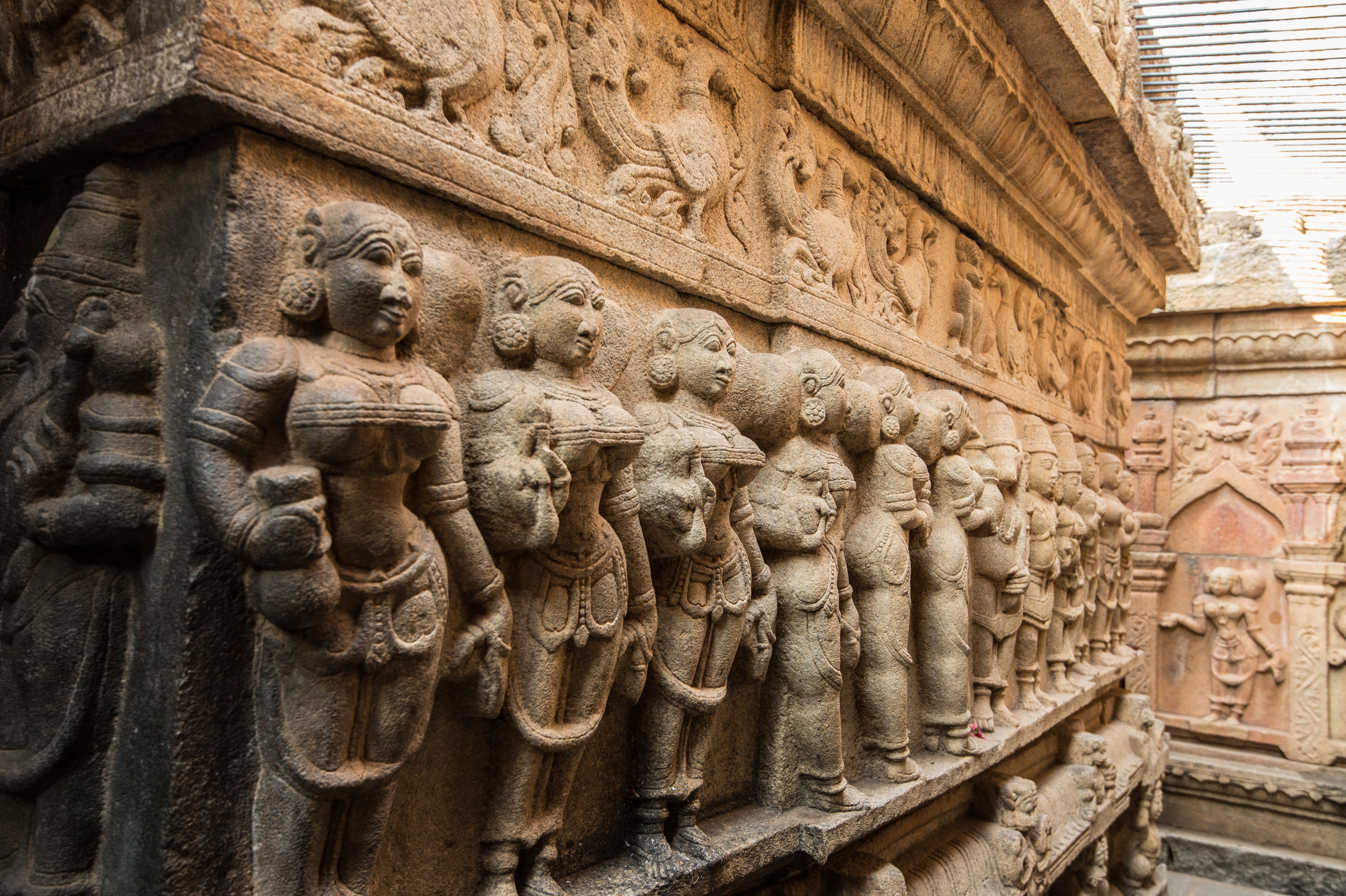
Intricate stone carvings of female figures on the exterior of the Uma Maheshswara shrine at the Bhoga Nandeeshwara Temple complex
