= Kanivenarayanapura =

- village
- Country: India
- State: Karnataka
- District: Chikballapur

Government
  - Type: Panchayat raj
  - Body: Gram panchayat

Population
  - Total: 250

Languages
  - Official: Kannada
- Time zone: UTC+5:30 (IST)
- ISO 3166 code: IN-KA
- Vehicle registration: KA
- Nearest city: Chikballapur
- Website: karnataka.gov.in

Kanivenarayanapura is a village located 6 km from Chikballapur, 3 km from Nandi Town and 2 km from Muddenahalli in Chikballapur District of Karnataka State.

== Transportation ==
Kanivenaryanapura can be reached by bus, it is 50 km from Bangalore via Yelahanka and Devanahalli.
