= Shirwad =

Village in Karnataka, India

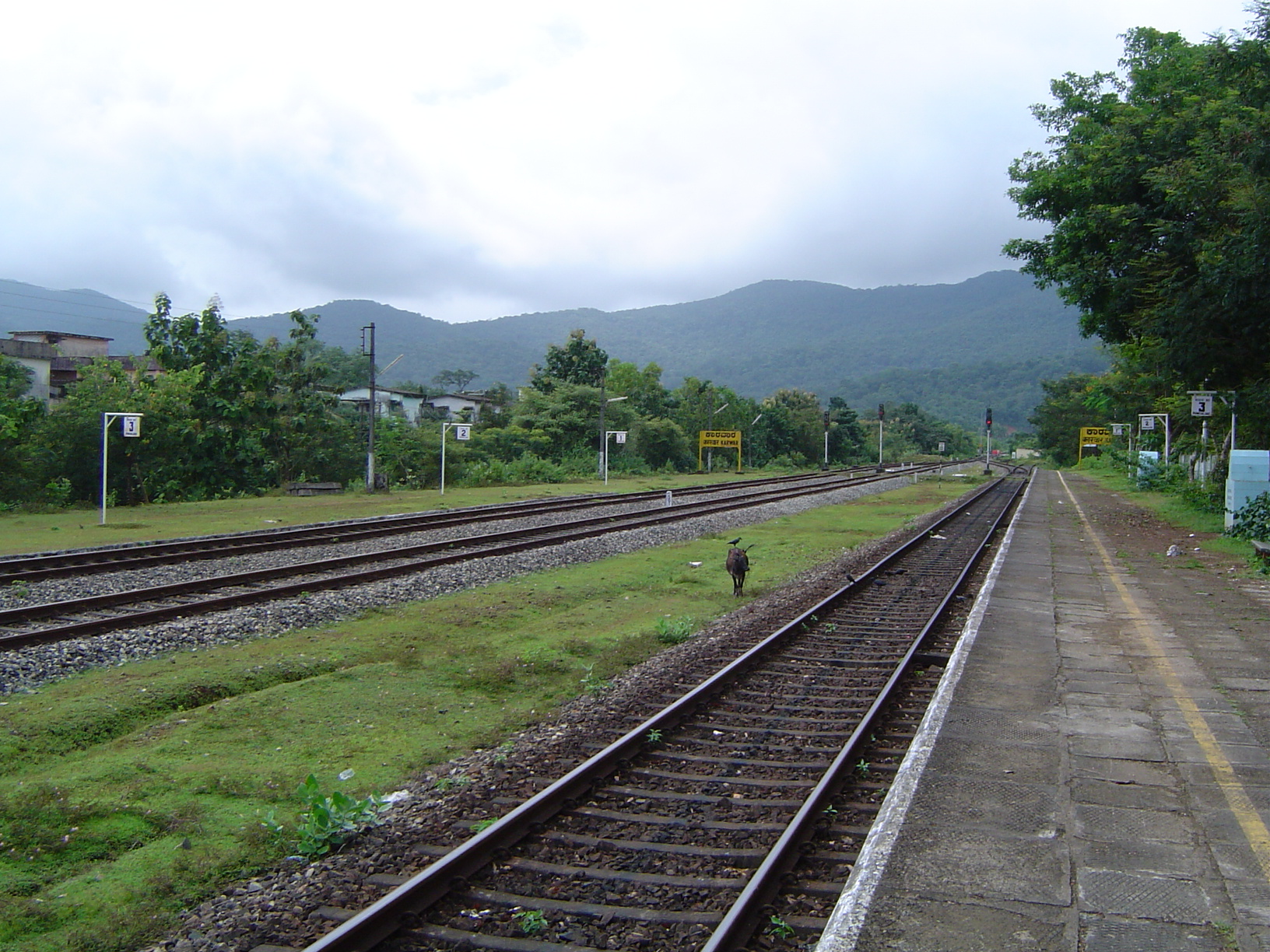
Karwar Railway Station at Shirwad

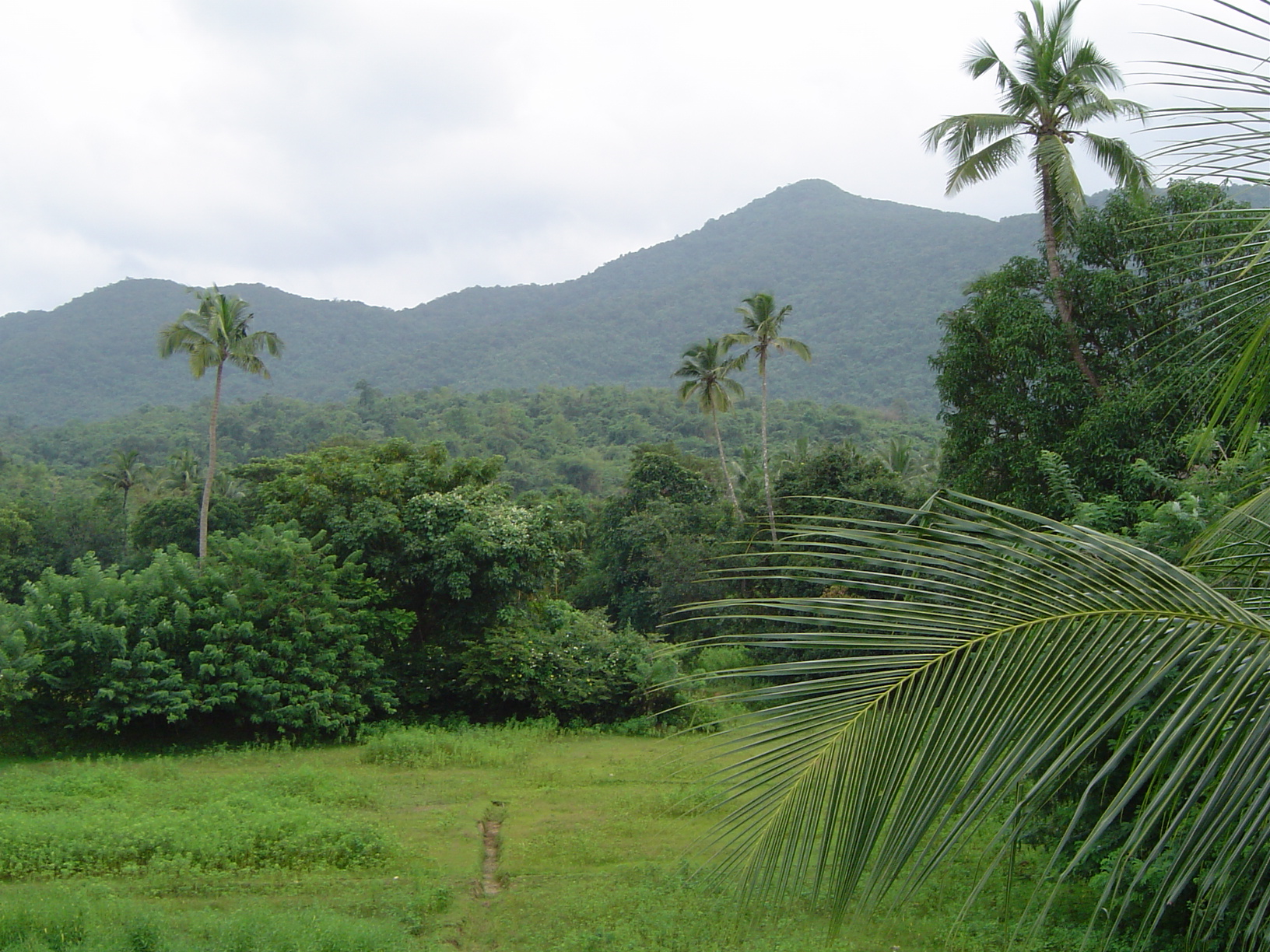
Shirwad landscape

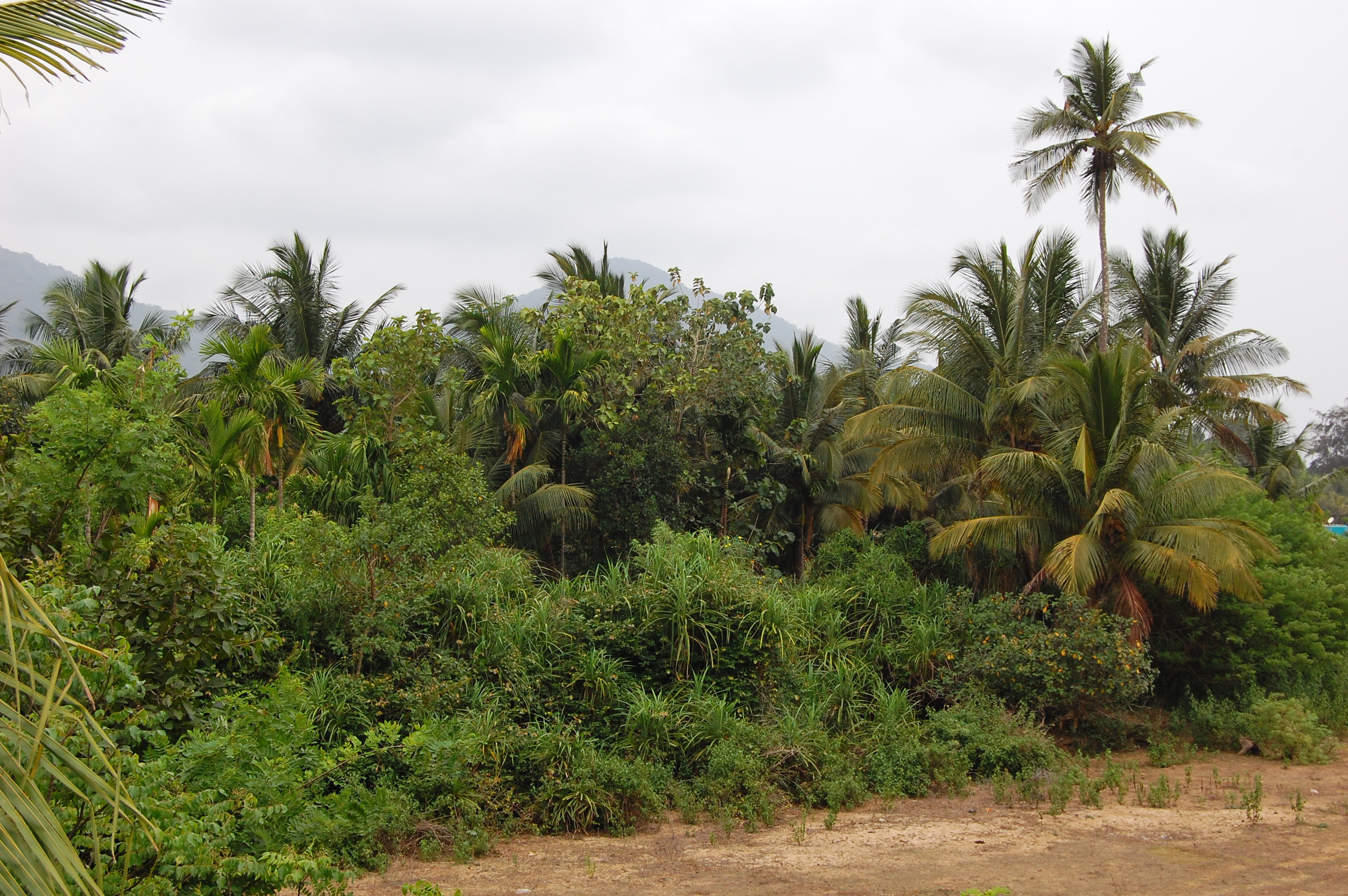
Greenery of Shirwad

Shirwad is a village 6 km. north-east of Karwar city in Uttara Kannada district, on the sea coast of Karnataka state in India.

A road from Karwar to Kaiga Nuclear Power Plant passes through Shirwad.

== Transport ==
Karwar is one of the important stations on the famous Konkan Railway route, and the Railway Station of Karwar is located at Shirwad. One end of India's 22nd longest railway tunnel, 2,950 metres long, is also situated at Shirwad. This is the longest railway tunnel in Karnataka.

== Landmarks ==
Shirwad has a rural setting with agricultural fields and rivulets. Flanked on one side by the densely forested hills of the Western Ghats, Shirwad is really picturesque. It also has an Industrial area with Small Scale Industrial Units. Real estate development is also taking place in Shirwad.

The other landmarks of Shirwad are:

- Sharda Ashram
- Gokul
- Puneetha Sadan (Seminary, office and residence of Bishop of Karwar)
- Maria Magnoflora Hospital
- Olive Garden Resort (earlier known as Hidden Valley Resort)
- KRCL Colony
- Devati Temple
- Baahu Falls

== Communications ==
The STD Code of Shirwad is 08382. Its PIN Code is 581306.

== See also ==
- Karwar
- Mangalore
- Kumta
- Chendia-Todur
