= Raspuri =

Variety of mango

Mangifera 'Raspuri'
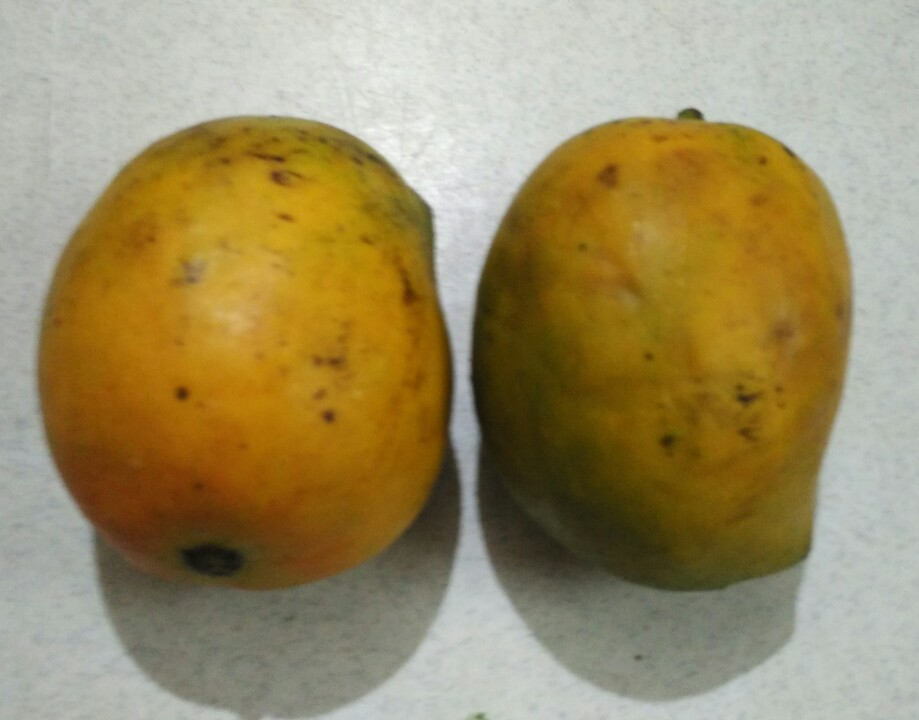
- Genus: Mangifera
- Species: Mangifera indica
- Cultivar: 'Raspuri'/'Pairi'
- Origin: India

The 'Raspuri' mango is an extremely popular variety of mango in the South Indian state of Karnataka especially grown in and around Bengaluru, Ramanagara, Kolar, Chikkaballapura, Tumakuru. This fruit is also known as sweet mango. It is also known as the Pairi mango in Maharashtra state.

It is generally found in Old Mysore, Karnataka.

== Description ==
Raspuri mangoes are oval in shape and about 4 to 6 inches long. The skin of the ripe fruit is reddish yellow in colour, and some people eat the skin though it can be a bit bitter for some taste buds. The mango has a warm sweet taste, is sometimes tart, and has a rich aromatic flavour. It is an excellent source of vitamins A and C. The pulp is suited for conversion to juices, nectars, drinks, jams, fruit cheese or to be had by itself or with cream as a dessert. It can also be used in puddings, bakery fillings, and fruit meals for children, flavours for the food industry, and also to make ice cream and yoghurt.

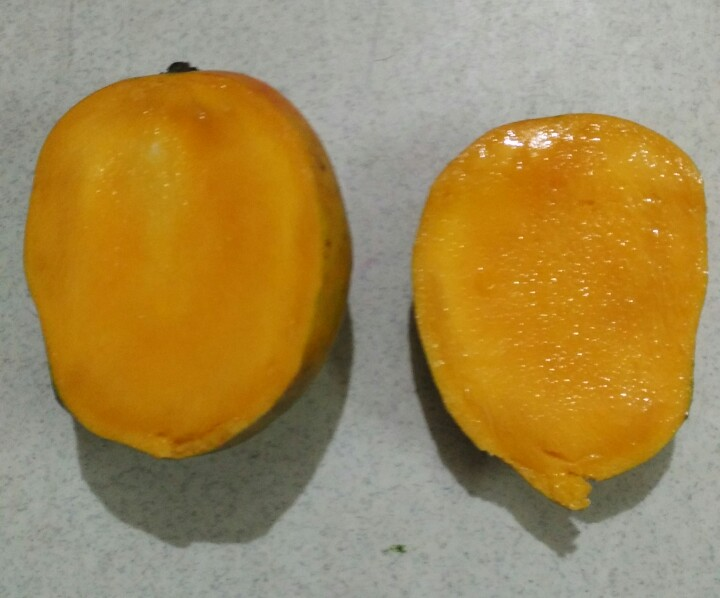
Sliced Raspuri mango

Raspuri mangoes are juicy in texture. They are rich in carotenes, a precursor of Vitamin A. This mango is grown widely in the south of India, primarily Karnataka. Raspuri mangoes are largely grown and eaten in the Old Mysuru region of Karnataka. Like the Alphanso and the Totapuri mango, the Raspuri mango is used in the making of ice creams, yogurts, smoothies, juices, jams and jellies.

A fully ripe Raspuri mango harvested at the right time and ripened naturally can beat them all in taste, as well as amount of juice per mango, including the Alphonso. The fully ripened Raspuri may have orange, green, red and mixed colours and the pulp is yellowish orange and is very sweet and juicy. If the fruit is not ripe or not ripened naturally, it may taste sour. This variety of mango arrives in the market early compared to other varieties, during the months of May and will usually be available until the beginning of June. Raspuri mangoes are also called by another name Pairi. If one hears the word Pairi Mango, it means they refer to Raspuri.

== See also ==
List of mango cultivars
