= Addagal (Chik Ballapur) =

- village
- Interactive map of Addagal
- Coordinates: 13.5219°N 78.2796°E
- Country: India
- State: Karnataka
- District: Chikkaballapur
- Talukas: Chik Ballapur

Government
  - Body: Village Panchayat

Languages
  - Official: Kannada
- Time zone: UTC+5:30 (IST)
- Nearest city: Kolar
- Civic agency: Village Panchayat

Addagal (Chik Ballapur) is a village in the southern state of Karnataka, India. It is located in the Chik Ballapur taluk of Chikkaballapur district in Karnataka.

== See also ==
- Kolar
- Districts of Karnataka
