= Chikkaballapur =

- City
- Interactive map of Chikkaballapur
- Coordinates: 13.43°N 77.72°E
- Country: India
- State: Karnataka

Government
  - Body: City Municipal Council

Area
  - City: 18.25 km^{2} (7.05 sq mi)
  - Rural: 635 km^{2} (245 sq mi)
- Elevation: 915 m (3,002 ft)

Population (2011)
  - City: 63,652
  - Density: 3,488/km^{2} (9,033/sq mi)
  - Rural: 148,884

Languages
  - Official: Kannada
- Time zone: UTC+5:30 (IST)
- PIN: 562101
- Vehicle registration: KA-40
- Lok Sabha constituency: Chikballapur Lok Sabha constituency
- Website: www.chikkaballapurcity.mrc.gov.in

Chikkaballapur or Chikkaballāpura is the district headquarters of the newly created Chikkaballapur district in the state of Karnataka, India, which was carved out from Kolar district. It is located within 3km of Muddenahalli (the birthplace of eminent engineer and statesman Sir Mokshagundam Visvesvarayya). A $400 million pharmaceutical SEZ is being constructed in Chikkaballapur on 325 acres (1.32 km^{2}), the first of its kind in India. Furthermore, the noted Traveler Bungalow is being converted into a state-of-the-art bus terminus. A new district government headquarters and police headquarters is being constructed at a cost of $5 million. In addition, the state government is releasing over $10 million to develop the city and expand underground sanitary systems. It is a regional transport and educational hub, and is a major site for grape, grain, and silk cultivation.

== Etymology ==
In the regional language, Kannada, the city is pronounced Chikkaballapura. "Chikka" in Kannada means "small", while "balla" means the measure to quantify food grains, and "pura" means "town". Thus, it is a place where people used to use small measures to quantify the food grains in ancient times. The place has always been known as an agricultural center for the region.

== History ==
The ruler of Avathi Mallabiregowda's son Marigowda was hunting one day in the Kodimanchanahalli forest. A rabbit stood in front of the fierce hunting dogs without fear. Seeing this, the ruler was elated and told his son that the strength of the rabbit was due to the valour of the region's citizenry. As such, the ruler took permission from the King of Vijaynagar and built an elaborate fort and formed a city which is now known as Chickballapur. Baichegowda, the king of Mysore, later attacked the fort but had to withdraw due to the valiant efforts of the Chikkaballapur citizens and aid from the Marathas. Sri Dodda Byregowda, who came to power after Baichegowda, acquired the land, which was taken by the Mysore king. In 1762, during the rule of Chikkappanayaka, Hyder Ali captured the town for a period of 3 months. Then Chikkappanayaka agreed to pay 5-lakhs pagodas, and the army was taken back.

After this, Chikkappa Nayaka with the help of Murariraya of Guthy tried to restore his powers. He was hiding at Nandi Hills along with Chikkappa Nayaka. Immediately, Hyder Ali acquired Chikkaballapur and other places and arrested Chikkappa Nayaka. Then with the interference of Lord Cornwallis, Chikkaballapur was handed over to Narayanagowda. After knowing this, Tippu Sultan again acquired Chikkaballapur. In 1791, the British occupied Nandi & left Narayanagowda to rule the town. Due to this treachery, a fight broke out between the British and Tippu Sultan. Narayanagowda lost his administration. Later, the British defeated Tippu in a battle which led to tremendous loss of life on both sides. The citizens of Chikkaballapur, however, refused to be subjugated and maintained their warrior pride. Chikkaballapur later came under the administration of the Wodeyars of Mysore, who later merged with the present state of Karnataka.

== Demographics ==
As of 2011 India census, Chikkaballapur had a population of 191,122. Males constitute 51% of the population and females 49%. Chikkaballapur has an average literacy rate of 64%, higher than the national average of 59.5%. 11% of the population is under 6 years of age.

== Geography ==
Chikkaballapur has a high elevation located in the center of the Nandi Hills region. "Panchagiri" is a common descriptor of Chikkaballapur as it is surrounded by 5 hills, among which Nandi Hill is the most famous. (The five hills are Nandi Giri, Chandra Giri, Skandagiri, Brahma Giri, and Hema Giri).

== Transportation ==
=== Road ===
The city of Chikkaballapur is well connected to prominent highways. NH-44, NH-69 and State Highway 74 (Karnataka) all pass through the city. It is 65 km from both Bengaluru and Kolar.

The city's public transport is mostly handled by the KSRTC. The KSRTC also has a bus depot in Chikkaballapur under the same division.

There is a BMTC bus service from here to Kempegowda Bus Station operated on Vajra Vistara bus.

=== Railways ===
Chikballapur railway station (station code: CBP) belongs to the Bengaluru division of South Western railway zone. It lies on the Yelahanka-Bangarpet line. This line also connects the city to Kempegowda International Airport halt railway station.

=== Air ===
The Kempegowda International Airport is the nearest international airport at 38 km.

== Taluks in Chikkaballapur District ==
The Chikkaballapur District includes the taluks (townships) of: Chikkaballapur, Gauribidanur, Bagepalli, Manchenahalli, Sidlaghatta, Chelur, Gudibande, and Chintamani.

== See also ==
- Addagal (Chik Ballapur)
- Adegarahalli
- Ajjavara, Chik Ballapur
- Harobande, Chik Ballapura
