= Muddenahalli =

- village
- Location in Karnataka, India Muddenahalli (India)
- Coordinates: 13°24′26″N 77°41′40″E
- Country: India
- State: Karnataka
- District: Chikballapur

Government
  - Body: Village Panchayat

Population
  - Total: 250

Languages
  - Official: Kannada
- Time zone: UTC+5:30 (IST)
- ISO 3166 code: IN-KA
- Vehicle registration: KA
- Nearest city: Chikballapur
- Literacy: 80%
- Lok Sabha constituency: Chikballapur
- Website: karnataka.gov.in

Muddenahalli is a village situated 7 km from Chikballapur in Chikballapur District of Karnataka State. It is the birthplace of M. Visvesvaraya, one of India's most accomplished engineers.

== Transportation ==
A railway station and railway line is being built from Chikballapur to Muddenhalli. A gondola lift is being built from the summit of Nandi Hill to Muddenahalli.

Muddenahalli is around 55 km from Bangalore via Yelahanka and Devanahalli. Public transport is available up to Chikkaballapur and then to Thirnahalli. Muddenahalli village is 2 km from this alighting point.

== Tourism ==
There is a memorial to Sir M. Visvesvarayya on the family-owned land at Muddenahalli, with the Nandi Hills as a backdrop. The museum was renovated in view of his 150th birth ceremonies conducted on 15 September 2010.
