= Guttahalli =

Guttahalli may refer to several places in or near Bangalore, Karnataka, India:

- Palace Guttahalli, a neighborhood in Bangalore
- Guttahalli, Kolar West, a village in Kolar Taluk, Kolar district
- Guttahalli, Kolar South, a village in Kolar Taluk, Kolar district
- Guttahalli, Bangarapet North, a village in Bangarapet Taluk, Kolar district
- Guttahalli, Bangarapet South, a village in Bangarapet Taluk, Kolar district
- Guttahalli, KGF, a village in KGF Taluk, Kolar district
- Hulkuru, locally known as Guttahalli and Bangaru Tirupati, a village in KGF Taluk, Kolar district
- Guttahalli, Chintamani (village code 624567), a village in Chintamani Taluk, Chikkaballapura district
- Guttahalli, Chintamani (village code 624588), a village in Chintamani Taluk, Chikkaballapura district
