= Kolar Lok Sabha constituency =

Lok Sabha constituency in Karnataka

Coordinates: 13.1°N 78.1°E

Kolar
- Lok Sabha constituency
- Kolar Lok Sabha Constituency Map

Constituency details
- Country: India
- Region: South India
- State: Karnataka
- Assembly constituencies: Sidlaghatta; Chintamani; Srinivasapur; Mulbagal; Kolar Gold Fields; Bangarapet; Kolar; Malur
- Established: 1952
- Reservation: SC

Member of Parliament
- 18th Lok Sabha
- Incumbent M. Mallesh Babu
- Party: JD(S)
- Alliance: NDA
- Elected year: 2024
- Preceded by: S. Muniswamy

Kolar Lok Sabha constituency is one of the 28 Lok Sabha constituencies in Karnataka.

== Vidhan Sabha segments ==
Presently, Kolar Lok Sabha constituency comprises the following eight Legislative Assembly segments:

| No | Name | District | Member | Party | Party Leading (in 2024) |
|---|---|---|---|---|---|
| 142 | Sidlaghatta | Chikballapur | B. N. Ravikumar | JD(S) | JD(S) |
| 143 | Chintamani | Chikballapur | M. C. Sudhakar | INC | JD(S) |
| 144 | Srinivasapur | Kolar | G. K. V. Reddy | JD(S) | JD(S) |
| 145 | Mulbagal (SC) | Kolar | Samruddhi Manjunath | JD(S) | JD(S) |
| 146 | Kolar Gold Fields (SC) | Kolar | M. Roopakala | INC | INC |
| 147 | Bangarapet (SC) | Kolar | S. N. Narayanaswamy | INC | JD(S) |
| 148 | Kolar | Kolar | Kothur G. Manjunath | INC | JD(S) |
| 149 | Malur | Kolar | K. Y. Nanjegowda | INC | JD(S) |

== Members of Parliament ==
| Year | Name | Party |
|---|---|---|
| 1952 | Doddathimmiah | Indian National Congress |
| 1957 | Doddathimmiah | Indian National Congress |
| 1962 | Doddathimmiah | Indian National Congress |
| 1967 | G. Y. Krishnan | Indian National Congress |
| 1971 | G. Y. Krishnan | Indian National Congress |
| 1977 | G. Y. Krishnan | Indian National Congress |
| 1980 | G. Y. Krishnan | Indian National Congress |
| 1984 | V. Venkatesh | Janata Party |
| 1989 | Y. Ramakrishna | Indian National Congress |
| 1991 | K. H. Muniyappa | Indian National Congress |
| 1996 | K. H. Muniyappa | Indian National Congress |
| 1998 | K. H. Muniyappa | Indian National Congress |
| 1999 | K. H. Muniyappa | Indian National Congress |
| 2004 | K. H. Muniyappa | Indian National Congress |
| 2009 | K. H. Muniyappa | Indian National Congress |
| 2014 | K. H. Muniyappa | Indian National Congress |
| 2019 | S. Muniswamy | Bharatiya Janata Party |
| 2024 | M. Mallesh Babu | Janata Dal (Secular) |

== Election results ==
Vote share of Winning candidates
| 2024 | 51.02% |
| 2019 | 56.35% |
| 2014 | 37.16% |
| 2009 | 37.17% |
| 2004 | 42.41% |
| 1999 | 39.47% |
| 1998 | 39.62% |
| 1996 | 44.38% |
| 1991 | 40.14% |
| 1989 | 51.85% |
| 1984 | 51.92% |
| 1980 | 50.19% |
| 1977 | 55.85% |
| 1971 | 81.31% |
| 1967 | 47.43% |
| 1962 | 43.54% |
| 1957 | 53.24% |
| 1951 (Note: In the 1951 election, Kolar was a multi-seat constituency with two INC candidates winning. The top candidate secured 28.42% of the votes, while the second secured 24.04%) | 28.42% |

=== 2024 ===
2024 Indian general election: Kolar
| Party | Candidate | Votes | % | ±% |
|---|---|---|---|---|
| JD(S) | M.Mallesh Babu | 691,481 | 51.02 | ▲18.10 |
| INC | K. V. Gowtham | 620,093 | 45.76 | ▲6.10 |
| NOTA | None of the above | 5,831 | 0.43 | ▼0.67 |
| Majority | | 71,388 | 5.26 | ▼11.40 |
| Turnout | | 1,356,814 | 78.51 | ▲1.26 |
| JD(S) gain from BJP | | Swing | | |

=== 2019 ===
2019 Indian general elections: Kolar
| Party | Candidate | Votes | % | ±% |
|---|---|---|---|---|
| BJP | S. Muniswamy | 709,165 | 56.35 | ▲32.64 |
| INC | K. H. Muniyappa | 4,99,144 | 39.66 | ▲2.50 |
| NOTA | None of the Above | 13,889 | 1.10 | N/A |
| Majority | | 2,10,021 | 16.69 | ▲12.45 |
| Turnout | | 12,59,093 | 77.25 | ▲1.74 |
| BJP gain from INC | | Swing | | |

=== 2014 ===
2014 Indian general elections: Kolar
| Party | Candidate | Votes | % | ±% |
|---|---|---|---|---|
| INC | K.H. Muniyappa | 418,926 | 37.16 | ▼0.01 |
| JD(S) | Kolar Kesava | 3,75,076 | 32.92 | ▲11.37 |
| BJP | M. Narayana Swamy | 2,67,322 | 23.71 | ▼10.98 |
| AAP | Kotiganahalli Ramaiah | 17,563 | 1.56 | New |
| Majority | | 47,850 | 4.24 | ▲1.76 |
| Turnout | | 11,27,340 | 75.51 | ▲6.36 |
| INC hold | | Swing | | |

=== 2009 ===
2009 Indian general elections: Kolar
| Party | Candidate | Votes | % | ±% |
|---|---|---|---|---|
| INC | K.H. Muniyappa | 344,771 | 37.17 | ▼5.33 |
| BJP | D. S. Veeraiah | 3,21,765 | 34.69 | ▼6.51 |
| JD(S) | G. Chandranna | 1,99,896 | 21.55 | ▲12.35 |
| Majority | | 23,006 | 2.48 | ▲1.18 |
| Turnout | | 9,27,261 | 69.15 | ▼2.75 |
| INC hold | | Swing | | |

=== 2004 ===
2004 Indian general election: Kolar (SC)
| Party | Candidate | Votes | % | ±% |
|---|---|---|---|---|
| INC | K. H. Muniyappa | 385,582 | 42.41 | ▲2.94 |
| BJP | D. S. Veeraiah | 373,947 | 41.13 | ▲11.81 |
| JD(S) | S. L. Gangadharappa | 83,433 | 9.18 | ▲5.90 |
| JP | Balaji Channaiah | 27,704 | 3.05 | New entry |
| Independent | B. N. Sreenivasappa | 22,047 | 2.42 | Steady |
| Independent | Srinivasa | 7,202 | 0.79 | Steady |
| Independent | M. M. Ravi Kumar | 4,693 | 0.52 | Steady |
| KNDP | N. M. Suresha | 4,656 | 0.51 | New entry |
| Majority | | 11,635 | 1.28 | ▼8.87 |
| Turnout | | | | |
| INC hold | | Swing | | |

=== 1999 ===
1999 Indian general election: Kolar (SC)
| Party | Candidate | Votes | % | ±% |
|---|---|---|---|---|
| INC | K. H. Muniyappa | 321,964 | 39.47 | ▼0.15 |
| BJP | G. Mangamma | 239,182 | 29.32 | ▼0.03 |
| JD(U) | Balaji Channaiah | 187,261 | 22.96 | New entry |
| JD(S) | M. G. Ramanna | 26,754 | 3.28 | New entry |
| Independent | A. N. Venkataravanappa | 21,604 | 2.65 | Steady |
| Independent | V. Narayana Swamy | 5,918 | 0.73 | Steady |
| Independent | Prakash | 5,453 | 0.67 | Steady |
| Independent | Gopinath | 5,101 | 0.63 | Steady |
| Independent | M. Chowdappa | 2,521 | 0.31 | Steady |
| Majority | | 82,782 | 10.15 | Steady |
| Turnout | | 862,812 | 75.32 | ▲3.05 |
| INC hold | | Swing | | |

=== 1998 ===
1998 Indian general election: Kolar (SC)
| Party | Candidate | Votes | % | ±% |
|---|---|---|---|---|
| INC | K. H. Muniyappa | 304,261 | 39.62 | ▼4.76 |
| JD | Balaji Channaiah | 226,289 | 29.47 | ▼12.48 |
| BJP | V. Hanumappa | 225,368 | 29.35 | ▲17.26 |
| CPI(M) | Narayanaswamy | 8,127 | 1.06 | New entry |
| Independent | S. B. Munivenkatappa | 1,637 | 0.21 | Steady |
| Independent | Alexander @ C. Ranganathan | 1,257 | 0.16 | Steady |
| Independent | S. P. Govinda Raju | 998 | 0.13 | Steady |
| Majority | | 77,972 | 10.15 | ▲7.72 |
| Turnout | | 780,806 | 72.27 | ▲3.99 |
| INC hold | | Swing | | |

=== 1996 ===
1996 Indian general election: Kolar (SC)
| Party | Candidate | Votes | % | ±% |
|---|---|---|---|---|
| INC | K. H. Muniyappa | 310,349 | 44.38 | ▲4.24 |
| JD | Balaji Channaiah | 293,307 | 41.95 | ▲16.06 |
| BJP | V. Hanumappa | 84,558 | 12.09 | ▼17.44 |
| PSSS | M. Puttaswamy | 830 | 0.12 | New entry |
| Independent | 9 Independent Candidates | 10,214 | 1.46 | Steady |
| Majority | | 17,042 | 2.43 | ▼8.18 |
| Turnout | | 714,163 | 68.28 | ▲5.25 |
| INC hold | | Swing | | |

=== 1991 ===
1991 Indian general election: Kolar (SC)
| Party | Candidate | Votes | % | ±% |
|---|---|---|---|---|
| INC | K. H. Muniyappa | 235,902 | 40.14 | ▼11.71 |
| BJP | V. Hanumappa | 173,525 | 29.53 | New entry |
| JD | B. Krishnappa | 152,157 | 25.89 | ▼6.32 |
| Independent | 13 Independent Candidates | 26,050 | 4.44 | Steady |
| Majority | | 62,377 | 10.61 | ▼9.03 |
| Turnout | | 603,518 | 63.03 | ▼11.03 |
| INC hold | | Swing | | |

=== 1989 ===
1989 Indian general election: Kolar (SC)
| Party | Candidate | Votes | % | ±% |
|---|---|---|---|---|
| INC | Y. Ramakrishna | 350,009 | 51.85 | ▲9.63 |
| JD | B. Muniyappa | 217,407 | 32.21 | New entry |
| JP | C. D. Shivanna | 76,243 | 11.29 | ▼40.63 |
| Independent | N. Venketeshu | 19,775 | 2.93 | Steady |
| Independent | B. Venkataswamappa | 4,426 | 0.66 | Steady |
| Independent | S. Gurulingappa | 3,378 | 0.50 | Steady |
| LKD | T. Krishnan | 1,962 | 0.29 | New entry |
| Independent | Yadigur Gangadharam | 1,827 | 0.27 | Steady |
| Majority | | 132,602 | 19.64 | ▲9.94 |
| Turnout | | 702,728 | 74.06 | ▲8.04 |
| INC gain from JP | | Swing | | |

=== 1984 ===
1984 Indian general election: Kolar (SC)
| Party | Candidate | Votes | % | ±% |
|---|---|---|---|---|
| JP | V. Venkatesh | 239,562 | 51.92 | ▲28.58 |
| INC | G. Y. Krishnan | 194,797 | 42.22 | New entry |
| Independent | 15 Independent Candidates | 27,026 | 5.86 | Steady |
| Majority | | 44,765 | 9.70 | ▼17.15 |
| Turnout | | 471,506 | 66.02 | ▲10.50 |
| JP gain from INC(I) | | Swing | | |

=== 1980 ===
1980 Indian general election: Kolar (SC)
| Party | Candidate | Votes | % | ±% |
|---|---|---|---|---|
| INC(I) | G. Y. Krishnan | 182,241 | 50.19 | New entry |
| JP | T. Channaiah | 84,729 | 23.34 | ▼11.73 |
| INC(U) | M. Narayana | 75,101 | 20.68 | New entry |
| JP(S) | B. Somasekhar | 7,790 | 2.15 | New entry |
| Independent | M. Chandrappa | 4,537 | 1.25 | Steady |
| Independent | B. Mallappa | 4,486 | 1.24 | Steady |
| Independent | K. M. Narayanappa | 1,856 | 0.51 | Steady |
| Independent | M. Muniswamy | 1,018 | 0.28 | Steady |
| Independent | A. K. Earappa | 667 | 0.18 | Steady |
| Independent | M. Chowdappa | 666 | 0.18 | Steady |
| Majority | | 97,512 | 26.85 | ▲6.07 |
| Turnout | | 374,057 | 55.52 | ▼5.27 |
| INC(I) gain from INC | | Swing | | |

=== 1977 ===
1977 Indian general election: Kolar (SC)
| Party | Candidate | Votes | % | ±% |
|---|---|---|---|---|
| INC | G. Y. Krishnan | 196,290 | 55.85 | ▼25.46 |
| JP | Y. Ramakrishna | 123,274 | 35.07 | New entry |
| Independent | T. M. Narayanappa | 12,381 | 3.52 | Steady |
| Independent | M. Muniswamy | 7,823 | 2.23 | Steady |
| Independent | N. Rachiah | 7,385 | 2.10 | Steady |
| Independent | Thiru Mallappa | 4,337 | 1.23 | Steady |
| Majority | | 73,016 | 20.78 | ▼52.09 |
| Turnout | | 361,610 | 60.79 | ▲4.48 |
| INC hold | | Swing | | |

=== 1971 ===
1971 Indian general election: Kolar (SC)
| Party | Candidate | Votes | % | ±% |
|---|---|---|---|---|
| INC | G. V. Krishnan | 217,037 | 81.31 | ▲33.88 |
| CPI(M) | G. Narayanaswamy | 22,518 | 8.44 | ▼15.28 |
| INC(O) | T. N. Raghavaiah | 15,542 | 5.82 | New entry |
| Independent | C. M. Arumagam | 10,407 | 3.90 | Steady |
| IUML | C. V. Muniswamy | 1,408 | 0.53 | New entry |
| Majority | | 194,519 | 72.87 | ▲49.74 |
| Turnout | | 276,204 | 56.31 | ▼6.90 |
| INC hold | | Swing | | |

=== 1967 ===
1967 Indian general election: Kolar (SC)
| Party | Candidate | Votes | % | ±% |
|---|---|---|---|---|
| INC | G. Y. Krishnan | 131,041 | 47.43 | ▲3.89 |
| Independent | Thirumalappa | 67,152 | 24.30 | Steady |
| CPI(M) | G. Narayanaswamy | 65,543 | 23.72 | New entry |
| Independent | B. H. Hanumappa | 12,564 | 4.55 | Steady |
| Majority | | 63,889 | 23.13 | ▲10.57 |
| Turnout | | 291,752 | 63.21 | ▲3.14 |
| INC hold | | Swing | | |

=== 1962 ===
1962 Indian general election: Kolar (SC)
| Party | Candidate | Votes | % | ±% |
|---|---|---|---|---|
| INC | Doddathimmaiah | 104,163 | 43.54 | ▼9.70 |
| Independent | G. Narayanaswamy | 74,104 | 30.98 | Steady |
| Independent | K. Venkatappa | 35,392 | 14.79 | Steady |
| Independent | D. Muniswamy | 13,547 | 5.66 | Steady |
| Independent | T. N. Raghavan | 12,024 | 5.03 | Steady |
| Majority | | 30,059 | 12.56 | ▲6.08 |
| Turnout | | 253,983 | 60.07 | ▲7.46 |
| INC hold | | Swing | | |

=== 1957 ===
1957 Indian general election: Kolar
| Party | Candidate | Votes | % | ±% |
|---|---|---|---|---|
| INC | K. Chengalaraya Reddy | 209,542 | 53.24 | ▲0.78 |
| Independent | V. M. Govindan | 184,009 | 46.76 | Steady |
| INC | Doddathimmiah | 0 | 0.00 | ▼52.46 |
| Independent | K. Shantiprakash | 0 | 0.00 | Steady |
| Independent | Venkatarayappa | 0 | 0.00 | Steady |
| Majority | | 25,533 | 6.48 | ▼2.43 |
| Turnout | | 393,551 | 52.61 | ▲4.18 |
| INC hold | | Swing | | |

=== 1951 ===
1951 Indian general election: Kolar
| Party | Candidate | Votes | % | ±% |
|---|---|---|---|---|
| INC | Doddathimmiah | 203,988 | 28.42 | New entry |
| INC | M. V. Krishnappa | 172,546 | 24.04 | New entry |
| Independent | J. T. Gopalakrishnan | 108,581 | 15.13 | Steady |
| CPI | V. M. Govindan | 73,322 | 10.21 | New entry |
| Independent | R. A. Dass | 67,571 | 9.41 | Steady |
| ABJS | M. S. Mahadevan | 47,180 | 6.57 | New entry |
| KMPP | Sampangiramiah | 44,660 | 6.22 | New entry |
| Majority | | 63,965 | 8.91 | New entry |
| Turnout | | 717,848 | 48.43 | New entry |
| INC win (new seat) | | | | |

== See also ==
- Kolar district
- List of constituencies of the Lok Sabha
