= Chowdareddy =

Indian politician

M. Chowdareddy

Minister of Home and Urban Development, Government of Karnataka
- In office 1992–1994
- Premier: M. Veerappa Moily

Member of the Karnataka Legislative Assembly
- In office 1999–2004
- Constituency: Chintamani
- In office 1989–1994
- In office 1983–1985
- In office 1978–1983
- In office 1972–1977

Personal details
- Party: Indian National Congress
- Other political affiliations: Independent (1999–2004)
- Spouse: Shanthamma
- Children: M. C. Sudhakar
- Parent: M. C. Anjaneya Reddy

M. Chowdareddy is an Indian politician, industrialist, and social reformer from Chintamani, Karnataka. He served five terms as the Member of the Karnataka Legislative Assembly representing Chintamani during 1972, 1978, 1983, 1989 and 1999.

Since 2017, Chowdareddy has faced accusations of a land-grab involving government property adjacent to his own property in Chintamani.

His son M. C. Sudhakar has also served as a legislator.
