= Kolar Gold Field Assembly constituency =

Constituency of the Karnataka legislative assembly in India

Coordinates: 12.96°N 78.26°E

Kolar Gold Fields
- Constituency No. 146 for the Karnataka Legislative Assembly

Constituency details
- Country: India
- Region: South India
- State: Karnataka
- Division: Bangalore
- District: Kolar
- Lok Sabha constituency: Kolar
- Established: 1951
- Total electors: 199,982
- Reservation: SC

Member of Legislative Assembly
- 16th Karnataka Legislative Assembly
- Incumbent M. Roopakala
- Party: Indian National Congress
- Elected year: 2023
- Preceded by: Y. Ramakka

Kolar Gold Fields Assembly constituency is one of the constituencies in Karnataka Legislative Assembly in India.

== Members of the Legislative Assembly ==
Election	Member	Party
1952	P. M. Swamidorai	Scheduled Castes Federation
1952	K. S. Vasan	Communist Party of India
1957	M. C. Narasimhan	Communist Party of India
1957	C. M. Armugam	Scheduled Castes Federation
1962	S. Rajagopal	Communist Party of India
1967	S. Rajagopal	Indian National Congress
1968^ (Note: Vacancy caused by the Election of Declared Void)	S. R. Shanmugam	Indian National Congress
1972	C. M. Armugam	Independent politician
1978	C. M. Armugam	Republican Party of India
1983	M. Bhakthavachalam	All India Anna Dravida Munnetra Kazhagam
1985	T. S. Mani	Communist Party of India
1989	M. Bhakthavachalam	All India Anna Dravida Munnetra Kazhagam
1994	S. Rajendiran	Bharatiya Rashtriya Party
1999	M. Bhakthavachalam	All India Anna Dravida Munnetra Kazhagam
2004	S. Rajendiran	Republican Party of India
2008	Y. Sampangi	Bharatiya Janata Party
2013	Y. Ramakka	Bharatiya Janata Party
2018	M. Roopakala	Indian National Congress
2023	M. Roopakala	Indian National Congress

== Election results ==
=== Assembly Election 2023 ===
2023 Karnataka Legislative Assembly election : Kolar Gold Field
Party	Candidate	Votes	%	±%
INC	M. Roopakala	81,569	55.10	▲4.12
BJP	Ashwini Sampangi	31,102	21.01	▼0.72
RPI	S. Rajendran	29,795	20.12	▲5.51
NOTA	None of the above	1,383	0.93	▼0.32
JD(S)	Dr. V. M. Ramesh Babu	1,360	0.92	▼5.51
CPI(M)	P. Thangaraj	1,008	0.68	New
CPI	Jothi Bash. R	918	0.62	New
Margin of victory		50,467	34.09	▲4.84
Turnout		148,075	74.04	▲0.81
Total valid votes		148,051		
Registered electors		199,982		▲4.88
INC hold		Swing	▲4.12	

=== Assembly Election 2018 ===
2018 Karnataka Legislative Assembly election : Kolar Gold Field
Party	Candidate	Votes	%	±%
INC	M. Roopakala	71,151	50.98	▲43.78
BJP	Ashwini Sampangi	30,324	21.73	▼17.05
RPI	S. Rajendran	20,393	14.61	▲7.73
JD(S)	M. Bhakthavachalam	8,976	6.43	▼14.01
NOTA	None of the above	1,750	1.25	New
CPI(M)	P. Thangaraj	1,746	1.25	▼0.30
KPJP	V. Muniswamy	1,259	0.90	New
AIADMK	M. Anbu	1,024	0.73	▼0.72
Margin of victory		40,827	29.25	▲10.91
Turnout		139,623	73.23	▲3.91
Total valid votes		139,569		
Registered electors		190,668		▲12.41
INC gain from BJP		Swing	▲12.20	

=== Assembly Election 2013 ===
2013 Karnataka Legislative Assembly election : Kolar Gold Field
Party	Candidate	Votes	%	±%
BJP	Y. Ramakka	55,014	38.78	▲10.34
JD(S)	M. Bhakthavachalam	28,992	20.44	▼4.05
INC	V. Shankar	10,218	7.20	▼4.94
RPI	S. Rajendiran	9,760	6.88	▼18.38
Hindustan Janta Party	V. Kalavathy	2,501	1.76	New
CPI(M)	P. Thangaraj	2,199	1.55	▼1.60
AIADMK	M. Anbu	2,052	1.45	▼0.56
Independent	Ramakka	951	0.67	New
Margin of victory		26,022	18.34	▲15.15
Turnout		117,583	69.32	▲6.67
Total valid votes		141,858		
Registered electors		169,615		▲1.89
BJP hold		Swing	▲10.34	

=== Assembly Election 2008 ===
2008 Karnataka Legislative Assembly election : Kolar Gold Field
Party	Candidate	Votes	%	±%
BJP	Y. Sampangi	29,643	28.44	New
RPI	S. Rajendiran	26,323	25.26	▼17.58
JD(S)	M. Bhakthavachalam	25,529	24.49	▲22.07
INC	N. Srinivasa	12,650	12.14	▼11.14
CPI(M)	P. Thangaraj	3,283	3.15	New
AIADMK	A. Anandraj	2,093	2.01	▼23.94
Independent	Sanda Muniswamy	1,129	1.08	New
Independent	B. M. Ramesh	769	0.74	New
BSP	M. Sridhar	700	0.67	▼0.06
Margin of victory		3,320	3.19	▼13.70
Turnout		104,303	62.65	▲10.72
Total valid votes		104,224		
Registered electors		166,473		▲60.34
BJP gain from RPI		Swing	▼14.40	

=== Assembly Election 2004 ===
2004 Karnataka Legislative Assembly election : Kolar Gold Field
Party	Candidate	Votes	%	±%
RPI	S. Rajendiran	23,098	42.84	▲17.31
AIADMK	Bhakthavathsalam	13,991	25.95	▼10.81
INC	Jayapal. D	12,549	23.28	New
JD(S)	K. Rajendran	1,305	2.42	New
Urs Samyuktha Paksha	Murali. K. C	966	1.79	New
Independent	Rajendiran. G	813	1.51	New
JP	Manivannan. B	497	0.92	New
BSP	Ranganatha. G	395	0.73	New
Margin of victory		9,107	16.89	▲10.70
Turnout		53,913	51.93	▼11.81
Total valid votes		53,913		
Registered electors		103,822		▲4.54
RPI gain from AIADMK		Swing	▲6.08	

=== Assembly Election 1999 ===
1999 Karnataka Legislative Assembly election : Kolar Gold Field
Party	Candidate	Votes	%	±%
AIADMK	M. Bhakthavachalam	22,255	36.76	▲8.67
BJP	Dr. K. Thinagaran	18,508	30.57	▲23.69
RPI	S. Rajendiran	15,461	25.53	▲25.04
CPI(M)	T. S. Mani	2,703	4.46	▼4.58
Independent	E. Ravichandran	771	1.27	New
Independent	D. Nirmala	446	0.74	New
Margin of victory		3,747	6.19	▼8.61
Turnout		63,301	63.74	▼1.49
Total valid votes		60,549		
Rejected ballots		1,956	3.09	▲1.75
Registered electors		99,315		▲0.52
AIADMK gain from Bharatiya Rashtriya Party		Swing	▼6.12	

=== Assembly Election 1994 ===
1994 Karnataka Legislative Assembly election : Kolar Gold Field
Party	Candidate	Votes	%	±%
Bharatiya Rashtriya Party	S. Rajendiran	27,271	42.88	New
AIADMK	M. Bhakthavachalam	17,862	28.09	New
CPI(M)	T. S. Mani	5,749	9.04	▼9.89
INC	M. Sampathkumar	4,573	7.19	New
BJP	M. Venkatesh	4,375	6.88	▲1.06
INC	A. K. Selvaraj	2,075	3.26	New
JD	K. Rajendran	1,000	1.57	New
Margin of victory		9,409	14.80	▼17.40
Turnout		64,453	65.23	▲0.78
Total valid votes		63,592		
Rejected ballots		861	1.34	▼3.20
Registered electors		98,802		▼5.60
Bharatiya Rashtriya Party gain from AIADMK		Swing	▼8.25	

=== Assembly Election 1989 ===
1989 Karnataka Legislative Assembly election : Kolar Gold Field
Party	Candidate	Votes	%	±%
AIADMK	M. Bhakthavachalam	32,928	51.13	New
CPI(M)	T. S. Mani	12,192	18.93	▼32.09
RPI	C. M. Armugam	8,995	13.97	New
BJP	M. Sureshkumar	3,746	5.82	▲4.32
Independent	R. Narayanan	3,050	4.74	New
JP	C. Balakrishnan	1,650	2.56	New
Independent	C. Gunasegaran	1,348	2.09	New
Margin of victory		20,736	32.20	▲3.77
Turnout		67,460	64.45	▼3.33
Total valid votes		64,396		
Rejected ballots		3,064	4.54	▲3.44
Registered electors		104,666		▲26.39
AIADMK gain from CPI(M)		Swing	▲0.11	

=== Assembly Election 1985 ===
1985 Karnataka Legislative Assembly election : Kolar Gold Field
Party	Candidate	Votes	%	±%
CPI(M)	T. S. Mani	28,325	51.02	▲18.20
Independent	M. Bhakthavachalam	12,545	22.60	New
Independent	C. M. Armugam	9,421	16.97	New
INC	S. Rajagopal	3,977	7.16	New
BJP	K. Nadarajan	830	1.50	New
Margin of victory		15,780	28.43	▲25.38
Turnout		56,131	67.78	▲3.38
Total valid votes		55,513		
Rejected ballots		618	1.10	▼0.04
Registered electors		82,815		▲16.51
CPI(M) gain from AIADMK		Swing	▲15.15	

=== Assembly Election 1983 ===
1983 Karnataka Legislative Assembly election : Kolar Gold Field
Party	Candidate	Votes	%	±%
AIADMK	M. Bhakthavachalam	16,234	35.87	New
CPI(M)	T. S. Mani	14,854	32.82	▲16.80
Independent	C. M. Armugam	12,043	26.61	New
Independent	S. Rajagopal	1,734	3.83	New
Margin of victory		1,380	3.05	▼14.58
Turnout		45,775	64.40	▼6.35
Total valid votes		45,253		
Rejected ballots		522	1.14	▼0.45
Registered electors		71,078		▲7.26
AIADMK gain from RPI		Swing	▼11.64	

=== Assembly Election 1978 ===
1978 Karnataka Legislative Assembly election : Kolar Gold Field
Party	Candidate	Votes	%	±%
RPI	C. M. Armugam	21,920	47.51	New
JP	S. Rajagopal	13,784	29.88	New
CPI(M)	T. S. Mani	7,389	16.02	▲6.77
INC	S. Thinakaran	1,742	3.78	▼34.57
Independent	R. Narayanan	1,115	2.42	New
Margin of victory		8,136	17.63	▲12.92
Turnout		46,884	70.75	▲1.00
Total valid votes		46,137		
Rejected ballots		747	1.59	▲1.59
Registered electors		66,264		▲21.68
RPI gain from Independent		Swing	▲4.45	

=== Assembly Election 1972 ===
1972 Mysore State Legislative Assembly election : Kolar Gold Field
Party	Candidate	Votes	%	±%
Independent	C. M. Armugam	16,077	43.06	New
INC	A. K. Selvaraj	14,317	38.35	New
CPI(M)	A. Muniswamy	3,453	9.25	New
Independent	G. Devaraj	1,831	4.90	New
INC(O)	S. R. Shanmugam	809	2.17	New
Independent	D. Asokan	558	1.49	New
Independent	M. Ganeshan	290	0.78	New
Margin of victory		1,760	4.71	
Turnout		37,983	69.75	
Total valid votes		37,335		
Registered electors		54,458		
Independent gain from INC				

=== Assembly By-election 1968 ===
1968 Mysore State Legislative Assembly by-election : Kolar Gold Field
Party	Candidate	Votes	%	±%
INC	S. R. Shanmugam			
INC hold		Swing	▼56.75	

=== Assembly Election 1967 ===
1967 Mysore State Legislative Assembly election : Kolar Gold Field
Party	Candidate	Votes	%	±%
INC	S. R. Gopal	20,024	56.75	▲34.55
RPI	C. M. Armugam	15,261	43.25	New
Margin of victory		4,763	13.50	▲13.00
Turnout		36,139	72.51	▼3.72
Total valid votes		35,285		
Registered electors		49,840		▲40.80
INC gain from CPI		Swing	▲30.04	

=== Assembly Election 1962 ===
1962 Mysore State Legislative Assembly election : Kolar Gold Field
Party	Candidate	Votes	%	±%
CPI	S. Rajagopal	6,886	26.71	▼0.65
RPI	C. M. Armugam	6,758	26.21	New
INC	P. Dorai Raj	5,725	22.20	▼14.32
Independent	S. R. Shanmugam	5,095	19.76	New
DMK	K. S. Gopaa Krishnan	1,100	4.27	New
Independent	M. C. Perumal	221	0.86	New
Margin of victory		128	0.50	▼8.22
Turnout		26,982	76.23	▲25.67
Total valid votes		25,785		
Registered electors		35,397		▼50.97
CPI hold		Swing	▼0.65	

=== Assembly Election 1957 ===
1957 Mysore State Legislative Assembly election : Kolar Gold Field
Party	Candidate	Votes	%	±%
CPI	M. C. Narasimhan	19,973	27.36	▲2.52
SCF	C. M. Armugam	19,548	26.78	▲4.27
INC	S. O. Bhagyanathan	13,608	18.64	▼19.66
INC	T. Channaiah	13,053	17.88	▼20.42
Independent	Dr. A. V. M. Swamy	2,714	3.72	New
Independent	M. E. Sambasivam	2,646	3.62	New
Independent	E. Subramaniam	1,460	2.00	New
Margin of victory		6,365	8.72	▲5.75
Turnout		73,002	50.56	▼63.66
Total valid votes		73,002		
Registered electors		72,200		▼6.77
CPI gain from SCF		Swing	▲4.85	

=== Assembly Election 1952 ===
1952 Mysore State Legislative Assembly election : Kolar Gold Field
Party	Candidate	Votes	%	±%
SCF	P. M. Swamidorai	19,911	22.51	New
CPI	K. S. Vasan	18,029	20.38	New
INC	K. V. Narayana Reddy	17,286	19.54	New
INC	M. Muniswamy	16,591	18.76	New
CPI	K. M. Subramani	3,948	4.46	New
Independent	R. B. Bhavarlal	2,439	2.76	New
Independent	Thimmiah	2,207	2.49	New
Socialist	Muthuswamy	1,991	2.25	New
Independent	B. N. Ramaswamy Iyer	1,867	2.11	New
Margin of victory		2,625	2.97	
Turnout		88,461	57.11	
Total valid votes		88,461		
Registered electors		77,446		
SCF win (new seat)				

== See also ==
- Kolar district
- List of constituencies of the Karnataka Legislative Assembly
