= Guttahalli, Chintamani (village code 624588) =

Guttahalli
- village
- Location in Karnataka, India Guttahalli (India)
- Coordinates: 13.381268012209471°N 77.97231006277347°E
- Country: India
- State: Karnataka
- District: Chikkaballapura
- Taluk: Chintamani

Government
  - Type: Panchayati raj (India)
  - Body: Gram panchayat

Population
  - Total: 592

Languages
  - Official: Kannada
- Time zone: UTC+5:30 (IST)
- Telephone code: 08154
- ISO 3166 code: IN-KA
- Vehicle registration: KA
- 2011 census code: 624588
- Website: karnataka.gov.in

Guttahalli is a small village in the Chintamani Taluk of Chikkaballapura district in Karnataka, India. It is situated about 12 kilometers from Chintamani.

== Demographics ==
According to the 2011 Indian Census, the village consists of 592 people. The town has a literacy rate of 64.87 percent which is lower than Karnataka's average of 75.36 percent.

Total Number of Household : 124
Population	Persons	Males	Females
Total	592	293	299
In the age group 0–6 years	55	23	32
Scheduled Castes (SC)	174	90	84
Scheduled Tribes (ST)	0	0	0
Literates	384	220	164
Illiterate	208	73	135
Total Worker	222	167	55
Main Worker	206	157	49
Main Worker - Cultivator	88	81	7
Main Worker - Agricultural Labourers	81	46	35
Main Worker - Household Industries	0	0	0
Main Worker - Other	37	30	7
Marginal Worker	16	10	6
Marginal Worker - Cultivator	2	0	2
Marginal Worker - Agriculture Labourers	12	8	4
Marginal Worker - Household Industries	0	0	0
Marginal Workers - Other	2	2	0
Marginal Worker (3-6 Months)	16	10	6
Marginal Worker - Cultivator (3-6 Months)	2	0	2
Marginal Worker - Agriculture Labourers (3-6 Months)	12	8	4
Marginal Worker - Household Industries (3-6 Months)	0	0	0
Marginal Worker - Other (3-6 Months)	2	2	0
Marginal Worker (0-3 Months)	0	0	0
Marginal Worker - Cultivator (0-3 Months)	0	0	0
Marginal Worker - Agriculture Labourers (0-3 Months)	0	0	0
Marginal Worker - Household Industries (0-3 Months)	0	0	0
Marginal Worker - Other Workers (0-3 Months)	0	0	0
Non Worker	370	126	244
