= Agraharahalli =

- village
- Location within Karnataka Location within India
- Coordinates: 13°34′10″N 78°02′57″E
- Country: India
- State: Karnataka
- District: Chikkaballapur
- Taluka: Chintamani

Government
  - Body: Village Panchayat

Population (2011)
  - Total: 203

Languages
  - Official: Kannada
- Time zone: UTC+5:30 (IST)
- Nearest city: Chintamani

Agraharahalli is a village in the Indian state of Karnataka. Located on the Deccan Plateau in the south-eastern part of Karnataka. It is located in the Chintamani taluk of Chikkaballapura District in Karnataka.There is no bus facility to the village. Primary occupation of the villagers are agriculture and sheep farming.
