= Kuruburu =

- Village
- Location in Karnataka, India Kuruburu (India)
- Coordinates: 13.4°N 78.006°E
- Country: India
- State: Karnataka
- District: Chikkaballapura

Area
  - Total: 12.5 km^{2} (4.8 sq mi)
- Elevation: 865 m (2,838 ft)

Population (2001)
  - Total: 65,456
  - Density: 5,236.48/km^{2} (13,562.4/sq mi)

Languages
  - Official: Kannada
- Time zone: UTC+5:30 (IST)
- PIN: 563 125
- Telephone code: 08154

Kuruburu is a village in Chintamani Taluk in the Chikballapur district in the state of Karnataka, India.

== Geography ==
Kurburu is located at 13.1854°N 78.440°E. It has an average elevation of 865 metres (2837 feet). It is a village, a Mandal Panchayat and part of the Chinthamani Taluk in the Chikkaballapura district. It became a part of the Chikkaballapur district in 2007 when the Kolar district was divided. Kurburu is located on the Chintamani- Kolar Road about 10 km from Chintamani. Kurburu is surrounded by hills.

== Demographics ==
As of 2001 India census, Kurburu had a population of 10,456. Males constitute 52% of the population and females 48%. Kurburu has an average literacy rate of 67%, higher than the national average of 59.5%; with male literacy of 73% and female literacy of 60%. 12% of the population is under 6 years of age. It is about 80 km to the new Bangalore International airport.

The economy is mostly agricultural, producing tomatoes, mangoes, silk, and milk. Kurburu's tomato market is one of the biggest in Karnataka. The Sericulture College of Karnataka is located in Kurburu.

The population of Kurburu speaks mainly Kannada and Telugu. Kannada remains the official and administrative Language.

== Educational institutions ==
1. Navodaya Vidya Samasthe, Kurburu Village Chintamani Taluk
2. Nanjamma Teachers Training Institute, Kurburu Village Chintamani Taluk
3. Sericulture College, Govt of Karnataka, Kurburu Farm
