= S. N. Narayanaswamy =

Indian politician (born 1968)

S. N. Narayanaswamy (born 1 June 1968) is an Indian politician from Karnataka. He is a three time member of the Karnataka Legislative Assembly from Bangarapet Assembly constituency which is reserved for Scheduled Caste community in Kolar district. He represents the Indian National Congress Party and won the 2023 Karnataka Legislative Assembly election.

== Early life and education ==
Narayanaswamy is from Bangarapet, Kolar district. His late father Muniyappa was a farmer. He completed his Bachelors degree in arts in 2021 at a college affiliated with Gandhi Institute of Technology and Management (GITAM), Deemed to be University.

== Career ==
Narayanaswamy won the Bangarapet Assembly constituency representing the Indian National Congress in the 2023 Karnataka Legislative Assembly election. He polled 77,292 votes and defeated his nearest rival, M. Mallesh Babu of the Janata Dal (Secular), by a margin of 4,711 votes. He first became an MLA winning the 2013 Karnataka Legislative Assembly election representing the Indian National Congress from Bangarapet. He polled 71,570 votes and defeated his closest opponent, Em Narayanaswamy of the Bharatiya Janata Party, by a margin of 28,377 votes. He retained the seat for the Congress in the 2018 Karnataka Legislative Assembly election. He polled 71,171 votes and defeated M. Mallesh Babu of the Janata Dal (Secular) by a margin of 21,871 votes. He won for the third time in 2023 election. He was named in the list as SN Narayanaswamy KM as another SN Narayanaswamy V, too contested the same election, as an independent.

He was appointed chairman for Karnataka Urban Infrastructure Development and Finance Corporation (KUIDFC) on 26 January 2024.
