= M. Roopakala =

Indian politician

Member of the Karnataka Legislative Assembly
- Incumbent
- Assumed office 15 May 2018
- Preceded by: Y. Ramakka

M. Roopakala Shashidhar (born 20 June 1979) is an Indian politician from Karnataka. She is a member of the 2023 Karnataka Legislative Assembly representing Kolar Gold Fields constituency in Kolar district. She won on an Indian National Congress ticket. She defeated Ashwini Sampangi of BJP by 50,467 votes. In January 2024, she was appointed the chairperson of the Karnataka Handicrafts Industrial Development Corporation.

== Early life and education ==
Roopakala is the daughter of K.H. Muniyappa, a seven-time Member of Parliament. She finished her post-graduation in arts from Karnataka State Open University in 2016. Her husband Shashidhar J. E. works as a director in the Karnataka assembly secretariat.

Her father Muniyappa, agreed to be dropped from the current Congress ministry to contest the 2024 Lok Sabha elections from Kolar, provided his daughter Roopakala is accommodated in the cabinet.

== Controversy ==
In June 2023, inaugurating the government Shakti scheme of free travel for women, she drove a bus for a short distance. After criticism for allowing the MLA to drive the bus, KSRTC Kolar division ordered an inquiry. She declared assets worth Rs.8 crore before the assembly elections.
