= Guttahalli, Chintamani (village code 624567) =

Guttahalli
- village
- Location in Karnataka, India Guttahalli (India)
- Coordinates: 13.398823356844137°N 77.98518466604921°E
- Country: India
- State: Karnataka
- District: Chikkaballapura
- Taluk: Chintamani

Government
  - Type: Panchayati raj (India)
  - Body: Gram panchayat

Population
  - Total: 454

Languages
  - Official: Kannada
- Time zone: UTC+5:30 (IST)
- Telephone code: 08154
- ISO 3166 code: IN-KA
- Vehicle registration: KA
- 2011 census code: 624567
- Website: karnataka.gov.in

Guttahalli is a small village in the Chintamani Taluk of Chikkaballapura district in Karnataka, India. It is situated about 9 kilometers from Chintamani.

== Demographics ==
According to the 2011 Indian Census, the village consists of 454 people. The town has a literacy rate of 59.25 percent which is lower than Karnataka's average of 75.36 percent.

Total Number of Household : 90
Population	Persons	Males	Females
Total	454	217	237
In the age group 0–6 years	61	28	33
Scheduled Castes (SC)	238	105	133
Scheduled Tribes (ST)	4	3	1
Literates	269	142	127
Illiterate	185	75	110
Total Worker	241	135	106
Main Worker	235	132	103
Main Worker - Cultivator	78	47	31
Main Worker - Agricultural Labourers	103	50	53
Main Worker - Household Industries	0	0	0
Main Worker - Other	54	35	19
Marginal Worker	6	3	3
Marginal Worker - Cultivator	4	2	2
Marginal Worker - Agriculture Labourers	0	0	0
Marginal Worker - Household Industries	0	0	0
Marginal Workers - Other	2	1	1
Marginal Worker (3-6 Months)	6	3	3
Marginal Worker - Cultivator (3-6 Months)	4	2	2
Marginal Worker - Agriculture Labourers (3-6 Months)	0	0	0
Marginal Worker - Household Industries (3-6 Months)	0	0	0
Marginal Worker - Other (3-6 Months)	2	1	1
Marginal Worker (0-3 Months)	0	0	0
Marginal Worker - Cultivator (0-3 Months)	0	0	0
Marginal Worker - Agriculture Labourers (0-3 Months)	0	0	0
Marginal Worker - Household Industries (0-3 Months)	0	0	0
Marginal Worker - Other Workers (0-3 Months)	0	0	0
Non Worker	213	82	131
