= S. Muniswamy =

Member of Parliament of India

Member of Parliament, Lok Sabha
- In office 23 May 2019 – 4 June 2024
- Preceded by: K. H. Muniyappa
- Succeeded by: M. Mallesh Babu
- Constituency: Kolar

Personal details
- Born: 16 April 1975 (age 50) Yaluvaguli, Malur Taluk, Kolar District, Karnataka
- Party: Bharatiya Janata Party
- Spouse: Shylaja

Sadappa Muniswamy (born 1975) is an Indian politician, a member of Bharatiya Janata Party (BJP). He was elected to the Lok Sabha, lower house of the Parliament of India, from Kolar in Karnataka in 2019 as a BJP candidate after causing massive upset by defeating congress heavyweight, former central minister and seven time member of parliament K. H. Muniyappa in his own bastion. Muniswamy participated in the launch of a new train service from Kolar to Whitefield and during the occasion promised to take up the doubling work of railway line between Marikuppam and Bangarpet-Kolar-Bangarpet.

In just a decade and half his political fortunes have skyrocketed from being a panchayat member to Member of Parliament. He was first elected in Kadugodi in Panchayat elections. Later he became a Corporator from Kadugodi Ward in Bangalore after winning BBMP elections in 2015. S. Muniswamy had unsuccessfully contested mayoral election, but lost against Sampath Raju of Congress in 2018.

== Controversy ==
On Women's Day event, Muniswamy scolded a woman vendor for not wearing bindi. Criticising it Congress MP P. Chidambaram said BJP will one day make India "Hindutva Iran".
