= M. C. Sudhakar =

Indian politician

Dr. M. C. Sudhakar
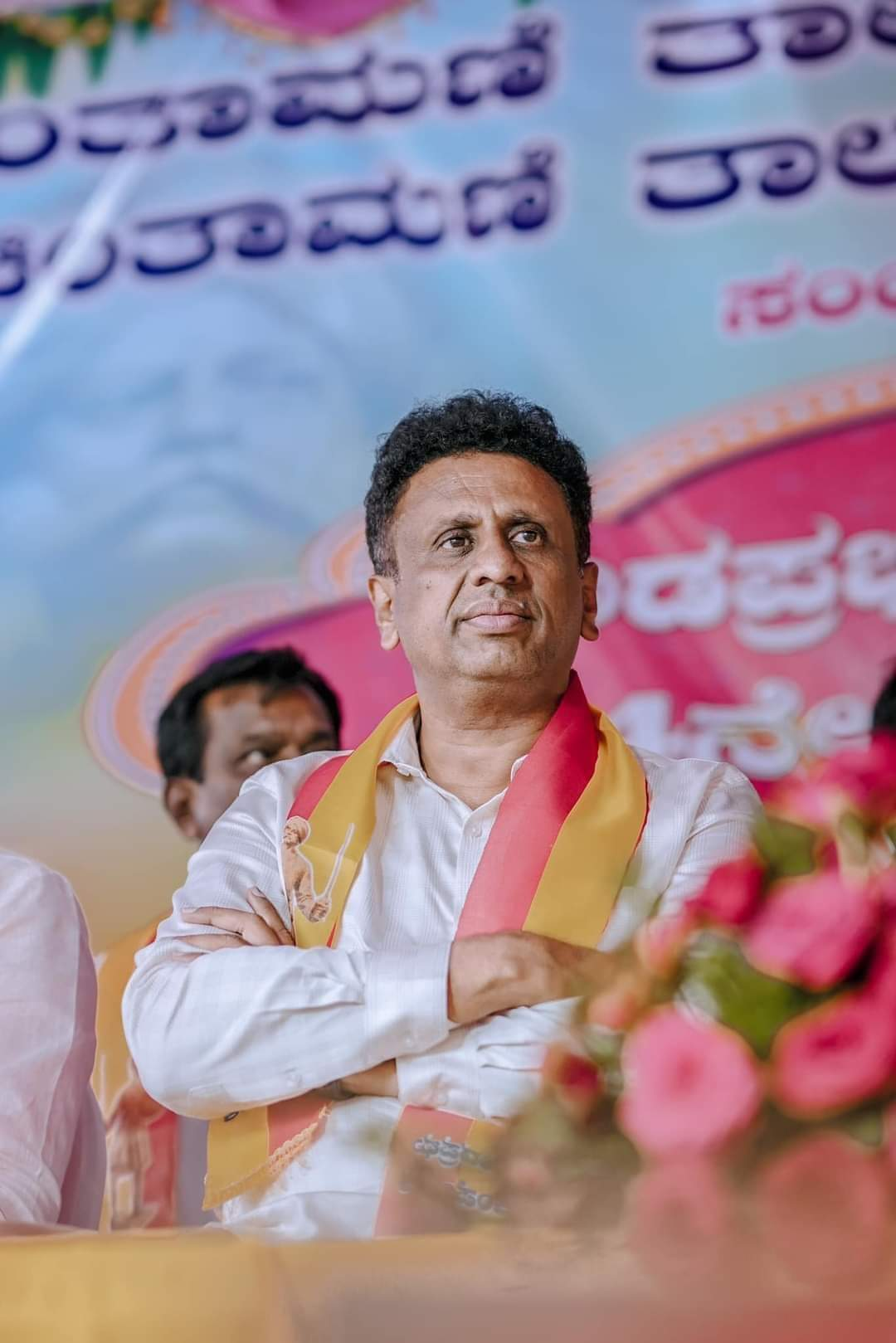
- M. C. Sudhakar

Cabinet Minister for Higher Education, Government of Karnataka
- In office 27 May 2023 – 29 May 2026
- Governor: Thawarchand Gehlot
- Chief Minister: Siddaramaiah

Member of Karnataka Legislative Assembly
- Incumbent
- Assumed office 2023
- Preceded by: M. Krishna Reddy
- Constituency: Chintamani
- In office 2004–2013
- Preceded by: Chowda Reddy
- Succeeded by: M. Krishna Reddy
- Constituency: Chintamani

Personal details
- Born: 18 March 1969 (age 57) Malapally, Chintamani, Karnataka
- Party: Indian National Congress
- Spouse: Smt. Sapna
- Children: M.S. Samanvay, Purvi Shika, Purav Shikar
- Parent: Chowdareddy (father) Smt.Shanthamma (mother)
- Relatives: M.C. Anjaneya Reddy (Grandfather) Smt. Kempamma (Grandmother) Dr. M.C. Balaji (brother) Smt. Padmaja (sister)
- Website: https://mcsudhakar.com

Dr. Malapalli Chowdareddy Sudhakar (born 18 March 1969) is an Indian politician serving as Cabinet Minister for Higher education, Government of Karnataka in cabinet of Siddaramaiah. He is serving as Member of the Legislative Assembly for third time from Chintamani Assembly under Indian National Congress.

== Early life and career as a doctor ==
Sudhakar's primary education took place at Kishore Vidhya Bhavan, Chintamani. He continued his schooling at Sathya Sai Loka Seva School, Muddenahalli.

He completed his pre university from National College, Basavanagudi and Bachelor of Dentistry from Bangalore Dental College in 1992. He completed his Master of Dental Surgery (Prosthodontics) from AB Shetty Dental College, Mangalore in 1994.

Sudhakar started his dental career at Mathrusri Ramabai Ambedkar Dental College and Hospital, Bangalore, as a Senior Lecturer while also maintaining a private practice at Cunningham Road. He later served as a professor at AECS Maaruti College of Dental Sciences & Research Centre, Bangalore and was also president of the Indian Dental Association Karnataka division.

== Political Background ==
Sudhakar's great-grandfather, Patel Chowdareddy, was a member of the Mysore Representative Assembly from 1903 to 1905 under the Mysore Princely State in the pre-independence era.

His grandfather, M C Anjaneya Reddy, was the first Municipal President of Chintamani in the pre-independence era and post-independence he was the first MLA of Chintamani in 1952 as an independent candidate. He continued as an MLA and MLC until his demise in 1976. He was the first President of the District Congress Committee of the undivided Kolar district.

Sudhakar's father, Chowdareddy, was Minister of Urban Development and Home in the cabinet of the then Chief Minister Shri M Veerappa Moily from 1992 to 1994 and served as an MLA for five terms from 1972 to 2004.

== Political career ==
In 1999, Dr. MC Sudhakar started actively involving in politics. After his father Chowdareddy’s retirement from active politics in 2004, Sudhakar contested the assembly elections for the first time under Indian National Congress and won. In 2008, he won consequently for second term as MLA. During his tenure in politics extensive developmental activities were taken up in the Taluk of Chintamani. Dr. MC Sudhakar had election setbacks in 2013 and 2018 as an independent candidate with margins of 1,696 and 5,240 votes respectively.

In 2023 Assembly elections Dr. MC Sudhakar won by a margin of 29,052 votes as congress candidate and he was appointed Cabinet Minister for Higher education, Government of Karnataka.

== Positions held ==
- 2023 - Present: Cabinet Minister for Higher Education, Government of Karnataka; Member of Legislative Assembly (third term)
- 2008 - 2013: Member of Legislative Assembly (second term)
- 2004 - 2008: Member of Legislative Assembly (first term)
- Professor at AECS Maaruti College of Dental Sciences & Research Centre, Bangalore
- Assistant Professor/Senior Lecturer, Mathrusri Ramabai Ambedkar Dental College and Hospital, Bangalore
