= Bangarapet Assembly constituency =

Constituency of the Karnataka Legislative Assembly in India

Coordinates: 12.99°N 78.18°E

Bangarapet
- Constituency No. 147 for the Karnataka Legislative Assembly

Constituency details
- Country: India
- Region: South India
- State: Karnataka
- District: Kolar
- Lok Sabha constituency: Kolar
- Established: 1951, 2008
- Total electors: 205,294
- Reservation: SC

Member of Legislative Assembly
- 16th Karnataka Legislative Assembly
- Incumbent S. N. Narayanaswamy
- Party: Indian National Congress
- Elected year: 2023
- Preceded by: M. Narayanaswamy

Bangarapet Assembly constituency is one of the 224 constituencies in the Karnataka Legislative Assembly of Karnataka, a southern state of India. It is also part of Kolar Lok Sabha constituency.

== Members of the Legislative Assembly ==
Election	Member	Party
1952	K. Chengalaraya Reddy	Indian National Congress
1953 By-election (Note: Resigned in 1952)	R. K. Prasad	Indian National Congress
1957	E. Narayana Gowda	Independent politician
1962	E. Narayana Gowda	Independent politician
2008	M. Narayanaswamy	Indian National Congress
2011 By-election (Note: Resigned on 20 October 2010)	M. Narayanaswamy	Bharatiya Janata Party
2013	S. N. Narayanaswamy	Indian National Congress
2018	S. N. Narayanaswamy	Indian National Congress
2023	S. N. Narayanaswamy	Indian National Congress

== Election results ==
=== Assembly Election 2023 ===
2023 Karnataka Legislative Assembly election : Bangarapet
Party	Candidate	Votes	%	±%
INC	S. N. Narayanaswamy	77,292	47.04%	▲1.75
JD(S)	M. Mallesh Babu	72,581	44.18%	▲12.81
BJP	M. Narayanaswamy	8,972	5.46%	▼15.89
AAP	Harikrishna Ramappa	2,530	1.54%	New
NOTA	None of the above	1,223	0.74%	▲0.02
Margin of victory		4,711	2.87%	▼11.05
Turnout		164,461	80.11%	▼1.24
Total valid votes		164,294		
Registered electors		205,294		▲6.24
INC hold		Swing	▲1.75	

=== Assembly Election 2018 ===
2018 Karnataka Legislative Assembly election : Bangarapet
Party	Candidate	Votes	%	±%
INC	S. N. Narayanaswamy	71,171	45.29%	▲1.51
JD(S)	M. Mallesh Babu	49,300	31.37%	▲17.38
BJP	Venkatamuniyappa. B. P	33,554	21.35%	▼5.07
NOTA	None of the above	1,127	0.72%	New
Margin of victory		21,871	13.92%	▼3.44
Turnout		157,199	81.35%	▼0.72
Total valid votes		157,152		
Registered electors		193,234		▲11.74
INC hold		Swing	▲1.51	

=== Assembly Election 2013 ===
2013 Karnataka Legislative Assembly election : Bangarapet
Party	Candidate	Votes	%	±%
INC	S. N. Narayanaswamy	71,570	43.78%	▲0.13
BJP	M. Narayanaswamy	43,193	26.42%	▼20.57
JD(S)	Ramachandra	22,863	13.99%	▲6.34
KJP	Sheshu. V	1,242	0.76%	New
Margin of victory		28,377	17.36%	▲14.02
Turnout		141,917	82.07%	▲3.45
Total valid votes		163,480		
Registered electors		172,929		▲12.42
INC gain from BJP		Swing	▼3.21	

=== Assembly By-election 2011 ===
2011 Karnataka Legislative Assembly by-election : Bangarapet
Party	Candidate	Votes	%	±%
BJP	M. Narayanaswamy	56,824	46.99%	▲8.90
INC	K. M. Narayanas	52,781	43.65%	▼1.24
JD(S)	C. Venkateshap	9,255	7.65%	▼4.00
Margin of victory		4,043	3.34%	▼3.46
Turnout		120,934	78.62%	▲5.65
Total valid votes		120,931		
Registered electors		153,829		▲1.65
BJP gain from INC		Swing	▲2.10	

=== Assembly Election 2008 ===
2008 Karnataka Legislative Assembly election : Bangarapet
Party	Candidate	Votes	%	±%
INC	Narayanaswamy. M	49,556	44.89%	▲13.67
BJP	Venkatamuniyappa. B. P	42,051	38.09%	New
JD(S)	Sheshu. V	12,859	11.65%	New
BSP	Nagendra. G. K	1,369	1.24%	New
Independent	Venkatesha. K	1,037	0.94%	New
Independent	Venkatesh. M	772	0.70%	New
Margin of victory		7,505	6.80%	▼26.38
Turnout		110,438	72.97%	▲18.23
Total valid votes		110,391		
Registered electors		151,337		▲154.94
INC gain from Independent		Swing	▼19.51	

=== Assembly Election 1962 ===
1962 Mysore State Legislative Assembly election : Bangarapet
Party	Candidate	Votes	%	±%
Independent	E. Narayana Gowda	19,626	64.40%	New
INC	K. V. Narayana Reddy	9,513	31.22%	▼12.74
RPI	Chamundi	1,336	4.38%	New
Margin of victory		10,113	33.18%	▲21.10
Turnout		32,492	54.74%	▲6.85
Total valid votes		30,475		
Registered electors		59,362		▲18.30
Independent hold		Swing	▲8.36	

=== Assembly Election 1957 ===
1957 Mysore State Legislative Assembly election : Bangarapet
Party	Candidate	Votes	%	±%
Independent	E. Narayana Gowda	13,467	56.04%	New
INC	D. Venkataramaiah	10,563	43.96%	▲4.23
Margin of victory		2,904	12.08%	▲10.17
Turnout		24,030	47.89%	
Total valid votes		24,030		
Registered electors		50,178		
Independent gain from INC		Swing	▲16.31	

=== Assembly By-election 1953 ===
1953 Mysore State Legislative Assembly by-election : Bangarapet
Party	Candidate	Votes	%	±%
INC	R. K. Prasad	5,635	39.73%	▼24.00
Independent	E. Narayanan	5,364	37.82%	New
COM	R. N. B. Reddy	3,184	22.45%	New
Margin of victory		271	1.91%	▼51.98
Total valid votes		14,183		
INC hold		Swing	▼24.00	

=== Assembly Election 1952 ===
1952 Mysore State Legislative Assembly election : Bangarapet
Party	Candidate	Votes	%	±%
INC	K. Chengalaraya Reddy	10,761	63.73%	New
Socialist Party (India)	B. Nagabhushana Gowda	1,661	9.84%	New
Independent	D. Muniswamy	1,349	7.99%	New
Independent	M. S. Dhruva	1,248	7.39%	New
Independent	A. Chinnappa	783	4.64%	New
Independent	Ballam Srinivasa Rao	571	3.38%	New
Independent	Venkata Reddy	512	3.03%	New
Margin of victory		9,100	53.89%	
Turnout		16,885	43.13%	
Total valid votes		16,885		
Registered electors		39,152		
INC win (new seat)				

== See also ==
- Kolar district
- List of constituencies of Karnataka Legislative Assembly
