= K. S. Vasan =

Indian politician

K.S. Vasan

K.S. Vasan was an Indian communist politician and trade unionist from the Kolar Gold Fields. who organized the first leftist trade union in the gold fields during the 1940s. Vasan, then a young man, arrived at the Kolar Gold Fields from Madras and went on to build a union that mobilized labourers from thirteen different mining companies. He was arrested as he led a workers revolt against the British authorities.

Vasan later teamed up with M. C. Narasimhan and V.M. Govindan. Together they were called the 'Red Triad'. The Red Triad combine managed to achieve several victories for the miners, such as wage revision.

As of 1963, Vasan was the president of the Mysore Mine Workers Union, which was affiliated with the All India Trade Union Congress (AITUC).

During the 1952 Mysore State Legislative Assembly election, Vasan contested the Kolar Gold Fields assembly seat. The constituency had two seats, one general and one reserved for Scheduled Castes; Vasan chose to contest the general seat, and was elected with 18,029 votes. P.M. Swamidorai of the Scheduled Castes Federation won the other seat.

When the Communist Party of India split, Vasan sided with the Communist Party of India (Marxist).
