= Guttahalli, Bangarapet North =

Guttahalli
- village
- Location in Karnataka, India Guttahalli (India)
- Coordinates: 13.006478389290043°N 78.13954712139649°E
- Country: India
- State: Karnataka
- District: Kolar
- Taluk: Bangarapet

Government
  - Type: Panchayati raj (India)
  - Body: Gram panchayat

Population
  - Total: 819

Languages
  - Official: Kannada
- Time zone: UTC+5:30 (IST)
- Telephone code: 08153
- ISO 3166 code: IN-KA
- Vehicle registration: KA
- 2011 census code: 608498
- Website: karnataka.gov.in

Guttahalli is a small village in the Bangarapet Taluk of Kolar district in Karnataka, India. It is situated about 7 kilometres (4.3 mi) from Bangarapet.

== Demographics ==
According to the 2011 Indian Census, the village consists of 819 people. The town has a literacy rate of 67.03 percent which is lower than Karnataka's average of 75.36 percent.

Total Number of Household : 173
Population	Persons	Males	Females
Total	819	404	415
In the age group 0–6 years	62	29	33
Scheduled Castes (SC)	228	117	111
Scheduled Tribes (ST)	12	6	6
Literates	549	305	244
Illiterate	270	99	171
Total Worker	479	257	222
Main Worker	272	238	34
Main Worker - Cultivator	109	103	6
Main Worker - Agricultural Labourers	67	47	20
Main Worker - Household Industries	2	2	0
Main Worker - Other	94	86	8
Marginal Worker	207	19	188
Marginal Worker - Cultivator	3	3	0
Marginal Worker - Agriculture Labourers	185	6	179
Marginal Worker - Household Industries	3	0	3
Marginal Workers - Other	16	10	6
Marginal Worker (3-6 Months)	207	19	188
Marginal Worker - Cultivator (3-6 Months)	3	3	0
Marginal Worker - Agriculture Labourers (3-6 Months)	185	6	179
Marginal Worker - Household Industries (3-6 Months)	3	0	3
Marginal Worker - Other (3-6 Months)	16	10	6
Marginal Worker (0-3 Months)	0	0	0
Marginal Worker - Cultivator (0-3 Months)	0	0	0
Marginal Worker - Agriculture Labourers (0-3 Months)	0	0	0
Marginal Worker - Household Industries (0-3 Months)	0	0	0
Marginal Worker - Other Workers (0-3 Months)	0	0	0
Non Worker	340	147	193
