= Dharmavarahalli =

Village in Karnataka, India

Coordinates: 13°38′N 78°03′E

Dharmavarahalli is a village in Chintamani Taluk of Chikkaballapura district, Karnataka. It is located at a distance of 30 km from Chintamani town, and is situated on the banks of Paapagni River which originates in the famed Nandi Hills. Though not very popular yet, its dwellers are gradually working to bring prominence to it.

== History ==
Dharmavarahalli was ruled by the Ganga Dynasty for a period of thousand years in the medieval times. The village got its present name during that time and retains it till date. Late Seethappa, the successor of Sri Kaiwara Thathayya of Kaiwara hailed from this place.

== Geography ==
In the modern times, it was a part of Kolar district of Karnataka till 2007. After the creation of Chikballapur district on 23 August 2007, Dharmavarahalli has come to be a part of it. Dharmavarahalli is located around 2700 feet above sea level. It is surrounded by Chintamani town to the north, Bagepalli Taluk to the South-West and the Bangalore Rural district to the North-West. It is located exactly 100 km from Bengaluru. The birthplace of Modern India's foremost visionary, Sir M. Visvesvarayya: Muddenahalli is located just 35 km from this village.

== Getting there ==
Only road transport can be used to arrive at this place. It is 58 km away from Devanahalli International Airport and just 20 km off NH-4 (Bengaluru-Hyderabad Road). The Karnataka-Andhra Pradesh border is situated just 3 km from this place, hence large number of APSRTC buses pass through it.

=== From Bengaluru ===
KSRTC, APSRTC and private buses plying from Bengaluru to Kadri and Tanakkal (in Andhra Pradesh) stop at Dharmavarahalli. The buses starting from Bengaluru are frequent at late night.

=== From Chintamani ===
KSRTC, APSRTC and private buses ply most frequently (one every 8 minutes) from Chintamani to Dharmavarahalli.

=== From Chikballapur ===
KSRTC and private buses play to and fro from Chikballapur to Dharmavarahalli, though very few in number.

== Places to see ==
Sri Rama and Anjaneya temple, located in this village is beautifully constructed. It is renowned for its sanctity and power.

Sri Lakshmi-Narasimha Swamy temple of Thirumalapura is situated within a dense forest of Niligiri trees. It is 2.5 km away from Dharmavarahalli bus-stand. Politicians frequent this temple. Rashtriya Swayamsevak Sangh (RSS) camps frequently at this place.

== Agriculture ==
Almost all people of the village are dependent on agriculture in the village. Groundnut is the flagship crop of the village, sown in monsoon. Tomato, Onion, Ragi and Rice are the other major crops sown throughout the year.

Dairy farming is practised by every family of the village. Cows are reared for milk and cow-dung. Sheep-rearing is also predominantly practised for wool and dung.

== Population ==
There are 70 houses in the village housing 480 people according to census of 2001. Adults (having voting rights) comprise 390 of this number. Almost all the villagers are Telugu speaking. There is a local Government primary school (Kannada medium).
