= Guttahalli, Bangarapet South =

Guttahalli
- village
- Location in Karnataka, India Guttahalli (India)
- Coordinates: 12.863574708538222°N 78.11376784218608°E
- Country≈: India
- State: Karnataka
- District: Kolar
- Taluk: Bangarapet

Government
  - Type: Panchayati raj (India)
  - Body: Gram panchayat

Population
  - Total: 300

Languages
  - Official: Kannada
- Time zone: UTC+5:30 (IST)
- Telephone code: 08153
- ISO 3166 code: IN-KA
- Vehicle registration: KA
- 2011 census code: 608581
- Website: karnataka.gov.in

Guttahalli is a small village in the Bangarapet Taluk of Kolar district in Karnataka, India. It is situated about 7 kilometers from Bangarapet.

== Demographics ==
According to the 2011 Indian Census, the village consists of 300 people. The town has a literacy rate of 62.33 percent which is lower than Karnataka's average of 75.36 percent.

Total Number of Household : 57
Population	Persons	Males	Females
Total	300	147	153
In the age group 0–6 years	35	12	23
Scheduled Castes (SC)	107	51	56
Scheduled Tribes (ST)	34	17	17
Literates	187	111	76
Illiterate	113	36	77
Total Worker	164	102	62
Main Worker	123	89	34
Main Worker - Cultivator	73	60	13
Main Worker - Agricultural Labourers	32	15	17
Main Worker - Household Industries	0	0	0
Main Worker - Other	18	14	4
Marginal Worker	41	13	28
Marginal Worker - Cultivator	14	2	12
Marginal Worker - Agriculture Labourers	26	10	16
Marginal Worker - Household Industries	0	0	0
Marginal Workers - Other	1	1	0
Marginal Worker (3-6 Months)	41	13	28
Marginal Worker - Cultivator (3-6 Months)	14	2	12
Marginal Worker - Agriculture Labourers (3-6 Months)	26	10	16
Marginal Worker - Household Industries (3-6 Months)	0	0	0
Marginal Worker - Other (3-6 Months)	1	1	0
Marginal Worker (0-3 Months)	0	0	0
Marginal Worker - Cultivator (0-3 Months)	0	0	0
Marginal Worker - Agriculture Labourers (0-3 Months)	0	0	0
Marginal Worker - Household Industries (0-3 Months)	0	0	0
Marginal Worker - Other Workers (0-3 Months)	0	0	0
Non Worker	136	45	91
