= Chintamani Assembly constituency =

Legislative Assembly constituency in Karnataka, India

Coordinates: 13.40°N 78.06°E

Chintamani
- Constituency No. 143 for the Karnataka Legislative Assembly

Constituency details
- Country: India
- Region: South India
- State: Karnataka
- District: Chikballapur
- Lok Sabha constituency: Kolar
- Established: 1951
- Total electors: 225,460
- Reservation: None

Member of Legislative Assembly
- 16th Karnataka Legislative Assembly
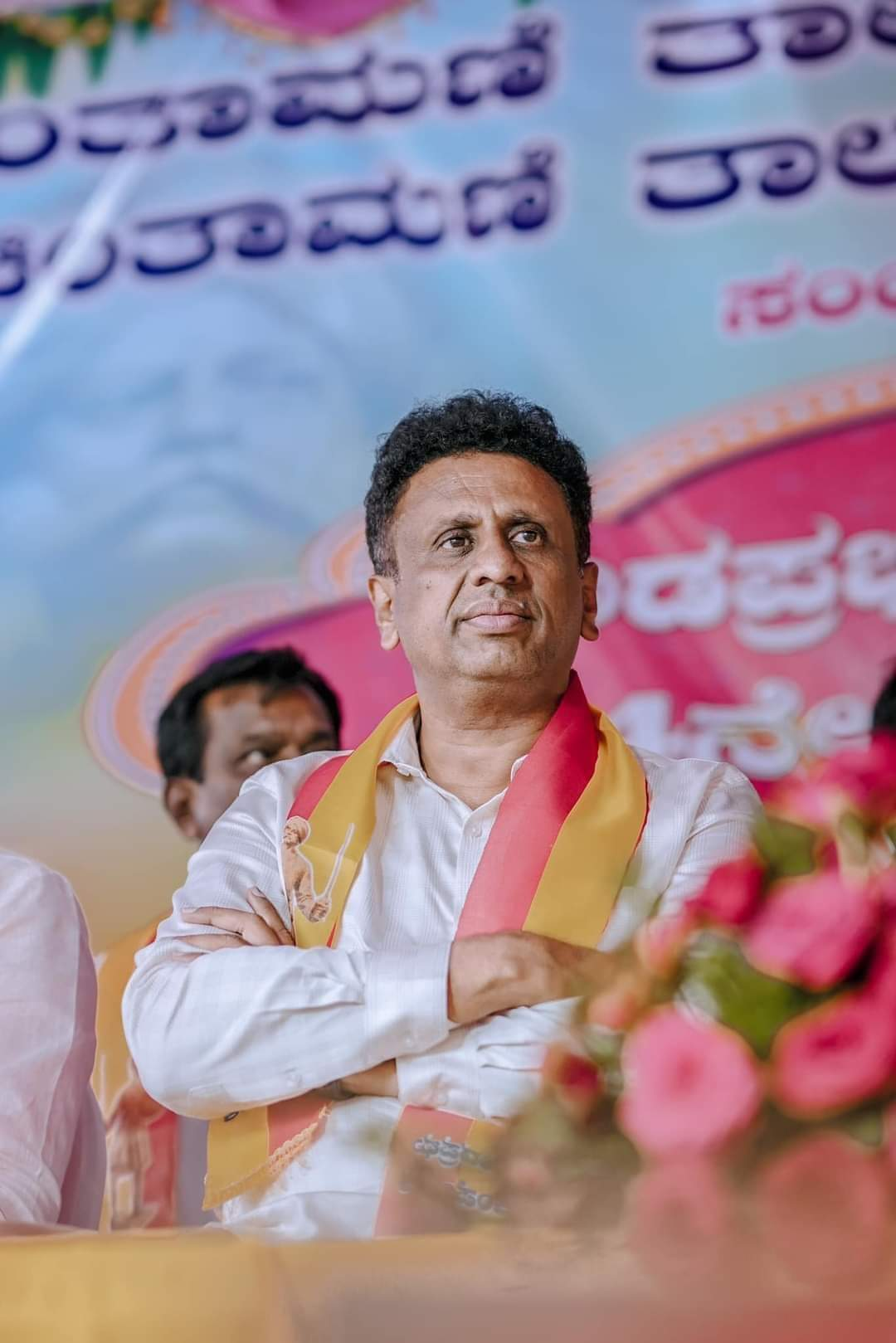
- Incumbent M. C. Sudhakar
- Party: Indian National Congress
- Elected year: 2023
- Preceded by: J. K. Krishna Reddy

Chintamani Assembly constituency is one of the 224 constituencies in the Karnataka Legislative Assembly of Karnataka, a southern state of India. It is also part of Kolar Lok Sabha constituency.

== Members of the Legislative Assembly ==
Election	Member	Party
1952	M. C. Anjaneya Reddy	Independent politician
1952	Narayanappa	Independent politician
1957	T. K. Gangi Reddy	Independent politician
1960 By-election	M. C. Anjaneya Reddy	Indian National Congress
1962	M. C. Anjaneya Reddy	Independent politician
1967	T. K. Gangi Reddy	Independent politician
1972	Chowda Reddy	Independent politician
1978	Chowda Reddy	Indian National Congress
1983	Chowda Reddy	Indian National Congress
1985	K. M. Krishna Reddy	Janata Party
1989	Chowda Reddy	Indian National Congress
1994	K. M. Krishna Reddy	Janata Dal
1999	Chowda Reddy	Independent politician
2004	Dr. M. C. Sudhakar	Indian National Congress
2008	Dr. M. C. Sudhakar	Indian National Congress
2013	J. K. Krishna Reddy	Janata Dal
2018	J. K. Krishna Reddy	Janata Dal
2023	Dr. M. C. Sudhakar	Indian National Congress

== Election results ==
=== Assembly Election 2023 ===
2023 Karnataka Legislative Assembly election : Chintamani
Party	Candidate	Votes	%	±%
INC	Dr. M. C. Sudhakar	97,324	51.05%	▲49.81
JD(S)	J. K. Krishna Reddy	68,272	35.81%	▼12.74
BJP	G. N. Venugopal (Gopi)	21,711	11.39%	▲10.30
NOTA	None of the above	866	0.45%	▼0.04
Margin of victory		29,052	15.24%	▲12.34
Turnout		191,011	84.72%	▲0.42
Total valid votes		190,632		
Registered electors		225,460		▲5.12
INC gain from JD(S)		Swing	▲2.50	

=== Assembly Election 2018 ===
2018 Karnataka Legislative Assembly election : Chintamani
Party	Candidate	Votes	%	±%
JD(S)	J. K. Krishna Reddy	87,753	48.55%	▲7.72
Bharatiya Praja Paksha	Dr. M. C. Sudhakar	82,513	45.65%	New
INC	Vani Krishna Reddy	2,233	1.24%	▼6.26
BJP	Naa Shankar	1,962	1.09%	▼0.04
Independent	N. R. Sudhakar	1,425	0.79%	New
NOTA	None of the above	877	0.49%	New
Margin of victory		5,240	2.90%	▲1.90
Turnout		180,818	84.30%	▼0.51
Total valid votes		180,758		
Registered electors		214,487		▲15.02
JD(S) hold		Swing	▲7.72	

=== Assembly Election 2013 ===
2013 Karnataka Legislative Assembly election : Chintamani
Party	Candidate	Votes	%	±%
JD(S)	J. K. Krishna Reddy	68,950	40.83%	▼2.67
Independent	Dr. M. C. Sudhakar	67,254	39.82%	New
INC	Vani Krishna Reddy	12,665	7.50%	▼36.95
BJP	Sathyanarayana Mahesh	1,911	1.13%	▼5.23
Independent	G. S. Subash	1,706	1.01%	New
Independent	Hari Sudhakara. V	1,252	0.74%	New
Margin of victory		1,696	1.00%	▲0.05
Turnout		158,148	84.81%	▲9.27
Total valid votes		168,875		
Registered electors		186,475		▲7.76
JD(S) gain from INC		Swing	▼3.62	

=== Assembly Election 2008 ===
2008 Karnataka Legislative Assembly election : Chintamani
Party	Candidate	Votes	%	±%
INC	Dr. M. C. Sudhakar	58,103	44.45%	▼6.72
JD(S)	K. M. Krishna Reddy	56,857	43.50%	▲41.57
BJP	Sathyanarayana Mahesh	8,311	6.36%	▼38.45
Independent	G. S. Sudhakara Reddy	1,950	1.49%	New
Independent	N. C. Krishna Reddy	1,681	1.29%	New
Independent	Sudhakar Reddy	1,546	1.18%	New
BSP	N. Muniswamy	1,419	1.09%	New
Margin of victory		1,246	0.95%	▼5.40
Turnout		130,723	75.54%	▲2.22
Total valid votes		130,710		
Registered electors		173,044		▼0.52
INC hold		Swing	▼6.72	

=== Assembly Election 2004 ===
2004 Karnataka Legislative Assembly election : Chintamani
Party	Candidate	Votes	%	±%
INC	Dr. M. C. Sudhakar	65,256	51.17%	▲42.15
BJP	K. M. Krishna Reddy	57,156	44.81%	New
JD(S)	Raghunathgowda. S	2,463	1.93%	New
Kannada Nadu Party	Kupendra. C. M	1,231	0.97%	New
Margin of victory		8,100	6.35%	▼7.30
Turnout		127,540	73.32%	▼3.26
Total valid votes		127,540		
Registered electors		173,956		▲9.44
INC gain from Independent		Swing	▼0.23	

=== Assembly Election 1999 ===
1999 Karnataka Legislative Assembly election : Chintamani
Party	Candidate	Votes	%	±%
Independent	Chowda Reddy	58,977	51.40%	New
JD(U)	K. M. Krishna Reddy	43,315	37.75%	New
INC	N. V. Srirama Reddy	10,349	9.02%	▼37.74
CPI(M)	G. V. Ashwathanarayana Reddy	2,106	1.84%	▲0.88
Margin of victory		15,662	13.65%	▲12.83
Turnout		121,718	76.58%	▼2.61
Total valid votes		114,747		
Rejected ballots		6,388	5.25%	▲3.59
Registered electors		158,952		▲12.48
Independent gain from JD		Swing	▲3.82	

=== Assembly Election 1994 ===
1994 Karnataka Legislative Assembly election : Chintamani
Party	Candidate	Votes	%	±%
JD	K. M. Krishna Reddy	52,293	47.58%	▲9.01
INC	Chowda Reddy	51,395	46.76%	▼12.47
BSP	N. Shivanna	1,431	1.30%	New
BJP	D. Sadappa	1,293	1.18%	New
INC	J. V. Narayanaswamy	1,178	1.07%	New
CPI(M)	G. C. Byreddy	1,052	0.96%	New
Margin of victory		898	0.82%	▼19.84
Turnout		111,904	79.19%	▲0.74
Total valid votes		109,907		
Rejected ballots		1,863	1.66%	▼2.13
Registered electors		141,317		▲10.56
JD gain from INC		Swing	▼11.65	

=== Assembly Election 1989 ===
1989 Karnataka Legislative Assembly election : Chintamani
Party	Candidate	Votes	%	±%
INC	Chowda Reddy	57,139	59.23%	▲13.76
JD	K. M. Krishna Reddy	37,206	38.57%	New
JP	Doddanarayana Reddy	1,191	1.23%	New
Margin of victory		19,933	20.66%	▲11.61
Turnout		100,265	78.45%	▼2.29
Total valid votes		96,468		
Rejected ballots		3,797	3.79%	▲2.35
Registered electors		127,814		▲26.14
INC gain from JP		Swing	▲4.70	

=== Assembly Election 1985 ===
1985 Karnataka Legislative Assembly election : Chintamani
Party	Candidate	Votes	%	±%
JP	K. M. Krishna Reddy	43,965	54.53%	▲11.88
INC	Chowda Reddy	36,665	45.47%	▼11.88
Margin of victory		7,300	9.05%	▼5.65
Turnout		81,808	80.74%	▲3.02
Total valid votes		80,630		
Rejected ballots		1,178	1.44%	▼0.98
Registered electors		101,327		▲11.51
JP gain from INC		Swing	▼2.82	

=== Assembly Election 1983 ===
1983 Karnataka Legislative Assembly election : Chintamani
Party	Candidate	Votes	%	±%
INC	Chowda Reddy	39,525	57.35%	▲55.99
JP	K. M. Krishna Reddy	29,395	42.65%	▲13.36
Margin of victory		10,130	14.70%	▼24.52
Turnout		70,628	77.72%	▼4.89
Total valid votes		68,920		
Rejected ballots		1,708	2.42%	▲0.31
Registered electors		90,870		▲9.30
INC gain from INC(I)		Swing	▼11.17	

=== Assembly Election 1978 ===
1978 Karnataka Legislative Assembly election : Chintamani
Party	Candidate	Votes	%	±%
INC(I)	Chowda Reddy	46,062	68.52%	New
JP	T. K. Gangi Reddy	19,692	29.29%	New
INC	Mohammed Fazlulla Sharief	914	1.36%	▼38.39
Independent	N. Shivanna	561	0.83%	New
Margin of victory		26,370	39.22%	▲25.25
Turnout		68,681	82.61%	▲10.35
Total valid votes		67,229		
Rejected ballots		1,452	2.11%	▲2.11
Registered electors		83,136		▲3.66
INC(I) gain from Independent		Swing	▲14.79	

=== Assembly Election 1972 ===
1972 Mysore State Legislative Assembly election : Chintamani
Party	Candidate	Votes	%	±%
Independent	Chowda Reddy	30,277	53.73%	New
INC	V. Seethappa	22,402	39.75%	▲0.09
CPI(M)	C. V. A. Narayana Reddy	2,099	3.72%	New
INC(O)	M. R. Seshagiri	1,576	2.80%	New
Margin of victory		7,875	13.97%	▼6.70
Turnout		57,953	72.26%	▼5.51
Total valid votes		56,354		
Registered electors		80,202		▲19.66
Independent hold		Swing	▼6.61	

=== Assembly Election 1967 ===
1967 Mysore State Legislative Assembly election : Chintamani
Party	Candidate	Votes	%	±%
Independent	T. K. Gangi Reddy	29,975	60.34%	New
INC	M. C. Anjaneya Reddy	19,705	39.66%	▼4.21
Margin of victory		10,270	20.67%	▲8.41
Turnout		52,127	77.77%	▲7.91
Total valid votes		49,680		
Registered electors		67,024		▲16.28
Independent hold		Swing	▲4.21	

=== Assembly Election 1962 ===
1962 Mysore State Legislative Assembly election : Chintamani
Party	Candidate	Votes	%	±%
Independent	M. C. Anjaneya Reddy	21,664	56.13%	New
INC	V. Seethappa	16,931	43.87%	▼7.73
Margin of victory		4,733	12.26%	▲9.06
Turnout		40,267	69.86%	
Total valid votes		38,595		
Registered electors		57,642		
Independent gain from INC		Swing	▲4.53	

=== Assembly By-election 1960 ===
1960 Mysore State Legislative Assembly by-election : Chintamani
Party	Candidate	Votes	%	±%
INC	M. C. Anjaneya Reddy	18,018	51.60%	▲11.98
Independent	A. Kempaiah	16,900	48.40%	New
Margin of victory		1,118	3.20%	▼8.80
Total valid votes		34,918		
INC gain from Independent		Swing	▼0.02	

=== Assembly Election 1957 ===
1957 Mysore State Legislative Assembly election : Chintamani
Party	Candidate	Votes	%	±%
Independent	T. K. Gangi Reddy	16,411	51.62%	New
INC	M. C. Anjaneya Reddy	12,595	39.62%	▲6.49
PSP	R. Narayanaswamy	2,074	6.52%	New
Independent	B. Sreenivasa Rao	709	2.23%	New
Margin of victory		3,816	12.00%	▲10.83
Turnout		31,789	66.37%	▼12.86
Total valid votes		31,789		
Registered electors		47,894		▼45.64
Independent hold		Swing	▲26.32	

=== Assembly Election 1952 ===
1952 Mysore State Legislative Assembly election : Chintamani
Party	Candidate	Votes	%	±%
Independent	M. C. Anjaneya Reddy	17,663	25.30%	New
Independent	Gangi Reddy	16,844	24.13%	New
INC	M. K. Narayanappa	14,991	21.47%	New
Independent	Narayanappa	9,412	13.48%	New
INC	M. Yellappa	8,139	11.66%	New
Independent	A. Narayanaswamy	2,758	3.95%	New
Margin of victory		819	1.17%	
Turnout		69,807	39.61%	
Total valid votes		69,807		
Registered electors		88,111		
Independent win (new seat)				

== See also ==
- Chikballapur district
- List of constituencies of Karnataka Legislative Assembly
