= Guttahalli, Kolar Gold Fields =

Guttahalli
- village
- Location in Karnataka, India Guttahalli (India)
- Coordinates: 12.975889154279736°N 78.30193018789566°E
- Country: India
- State: Karnataka
- District: Kolar
- Taluk: Kolar Gold Fields

Government
  - Type: Panchayati raj (India)
  - Body: Gram panchayat

Population
  - Total: 265

Languages
  - Official: Kannada
- Time zone: UTC+5:30 (IST)
- Telephone code: 08153
- ISO 3166 code: IN-KA
- Vehicle registration: KA
- 2011 census code: 608754
- Website: karnataka.gov.in

Guttahalli is a small village in the Kolar Gold Fields Taluk of Kolar district in Karnataka, India. It is situated about 4 kilometers from Kolar Gold Fields, forming the outskirts of the city.

== Demographics ==
According to the 2011 Indian Census, the village consists of 265 people. The town has a literacy rate of 60.38 percent which is lower than Karnataka's average of 75.36 percent.

Total Number of Household : 63
Population	Persons	Males	Females
Total	265	133	132
In the age group 0–6 years	38	18	20
Scheduled Castes (SC)	193	99	94
Scheduled Tribes (ST)	0	0	0
Literates	160	93	67
Illiterate	105	40	65
Total Worker	128	81	47
Main Worker	125	79	46
Main Worker - Cultivator	0	0	0
Main Worker - Agricultural Labourers	67	34	33
Main Worker - Household Industries	0	0	0
Main Worker - Other	58	45	13
Marginal Worker	3	2	1
Marginal Worker - Cultivator	0	0	0
Marginal Worker - Agriculture Labourers	1	1	0
Marginal Worker - Household Industries	0	0	0
Marginal Workers - Other	2	1	1
Marginal Worker (3–6 Months)	3	2	1
Marginal Worker - Cultivator (3–6 Months)	0	0	0
Marginal Worker - Agriculture Labourers (3–6 Months)	1	1	0
Marginal Worker - Household Industries (3–6 Months)	0	0	0
Marginal Worker - Other (3–6 Months)	2	1	1
Marginal Worker (0–3 Months)	0	0	0
Marginal Worker - Cultivator (0–3 Months)	0	0	0
Marginal Worker - Agriculture Labourers (0–3 Months)	0	0	0
Marginal Worker - Household Industries (0–3 Months)	0	0	0
Marginal Worker - Other Workers (0–3 Months)	0	0	0
Non Worker	137	52	85
