= K. H. Muniyappa =

Indian politician

K.H. Muniyappa
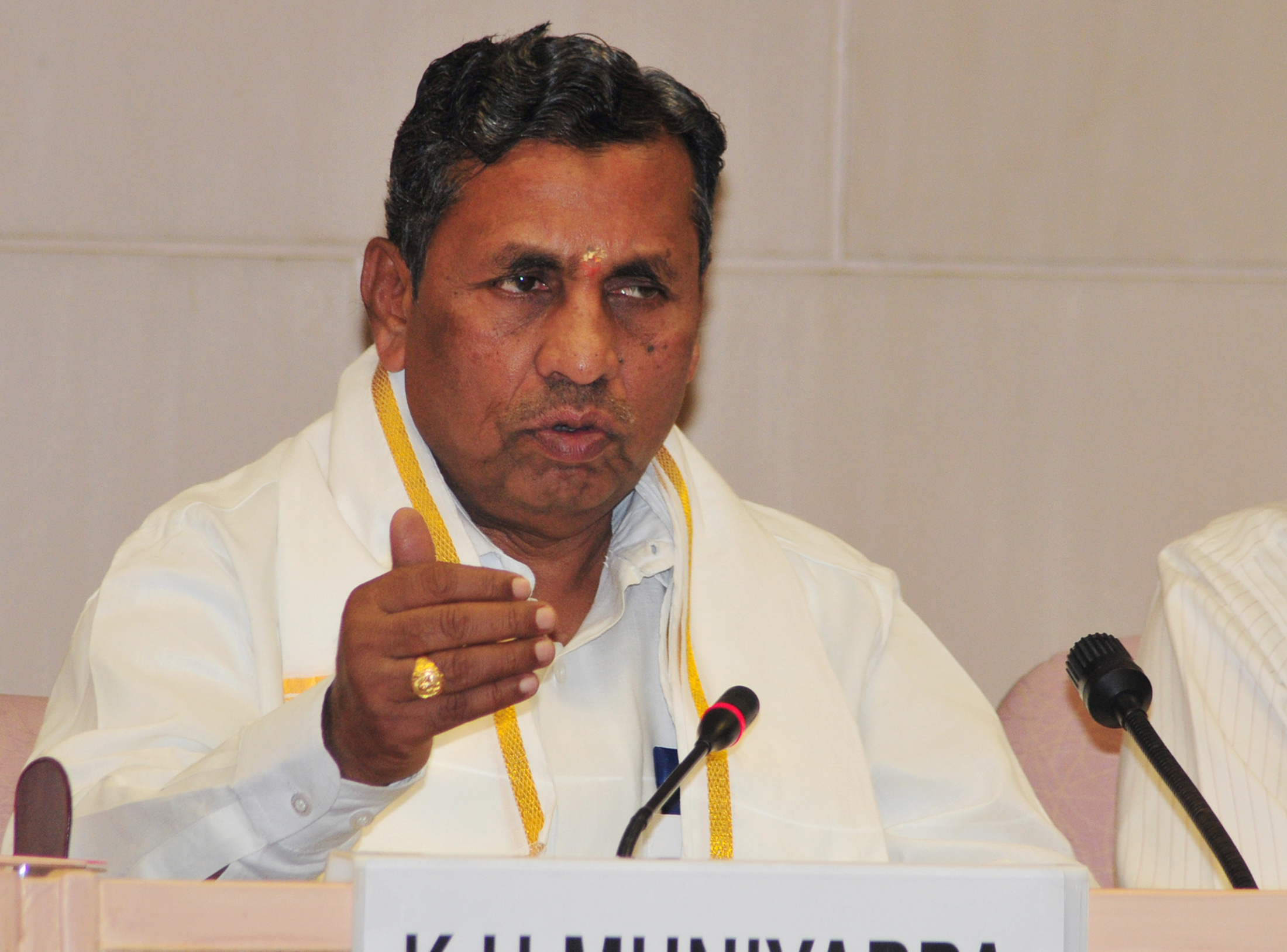

Cabinet Minister Government of Karnataka
- Incumbent
- Assumed office 3 June 2026
- Governor: Thawar Chand Gehlot
- Cabinet: Shivakumar ministry
- Chief Minister: D. K. Shivakumar
- Ministry and Departments: Social Welfare
- Preceded by: H. C. Mahadevappa
- In office 20 May 2023 – 29 May 2026
- Governor: Thawar Chand Gehlot
- Cabinet: Second Siddaramaiah ministry
- Chief Minister: Siddaramaiah
- Ministry and Departments: Food & Civil Supplies; Consumer Affairs
- Preceded by: Umesh Katti
- Succeeded by: Rizwan Arshad

Member of Karnataka Legislative Assembly
- Incumbent
- Assumed office 13 May 2023
- Preceded by: L. N. Narayanaswamy
- Constituency: Devanahalli

Union Minister of State(Independent charge), Minister of Micro, Small and Medium Enterprises
- In office 28 October 2012 – 26 May 2014
- Prime Minister: Dr. Manmohan Singh
- Preceded by: Vayalar Ravi
- Succeeded by: Kalraj Mishra

Member of Parliament Lok Sabha
- In office 1991–2019
- Preceded by: Y. Ramakrishna
- Succeeded by: S. Muniswamy
- Constituency: Kolar

Minister of State, Government of India
- In office 22 May 2009 – 28 October 2012
- President: Pratibha Patil; Pranab Mukherjee
- Cabinet: Second Manmohan Singh ministry
- Prime Minister: Manmohan Singh
- Ministry and Departments: Railways
- In office 23 May 2004 – 22 May 2009
- President: A. P. J. Abdul Kalam; Pratibha Patil
- Cabinet: First Manmohan Singh ministry
- Prime Minister: Manmohan Singh
- Ministry and Departments: Road, Transport & Highways

Personal details
- Born: 7 March 1948 (age 78) Kammadhalli village, Shidlaghatta, Karnataka
- Party: INC
- Spouse: M. Nagarathnamma
- Children: 1 son and 4 daughters including Roopakala M Shashidhar
- Awards: Doctorate
- As of 25 September, 2006

Kambadahalli Hanumappa Muniyappa (born 7 March 1948) is an Indian politician from Karnataka. He is a seven time Member of the Parliament from Kolar Lok Sabha constituency and also served as a Cabinet Minister.

== Early life and education ==
Muniyappa belongs to Madiga community, a member of Scheduled Castes community. He completed his graduation in law in 1986 at SJRC College, which is affiliated with Bangalore University. He was also awarded a doctorate by Gulbarga University. He belongs to Madiga community, a sub-group which is considered as a Dalit left community.

== Career ==
Muniyappa has represented Kolar seven times consecutively: He was first elected as an MP in 1991 to the 10th Lok Sabha. Then he won the MP seat for the next six elections to become a seven time MP. He was a member of the 11th Lok Sabha, 12th Lok Sabha, 13th Lok Sabha, 14th Lok Sabha, 15th Lok Sabha and 16th Lok Sabha. However, he lost the 2019 elections to a largely unknown face S. Muniswamy by more than one lakh votes.

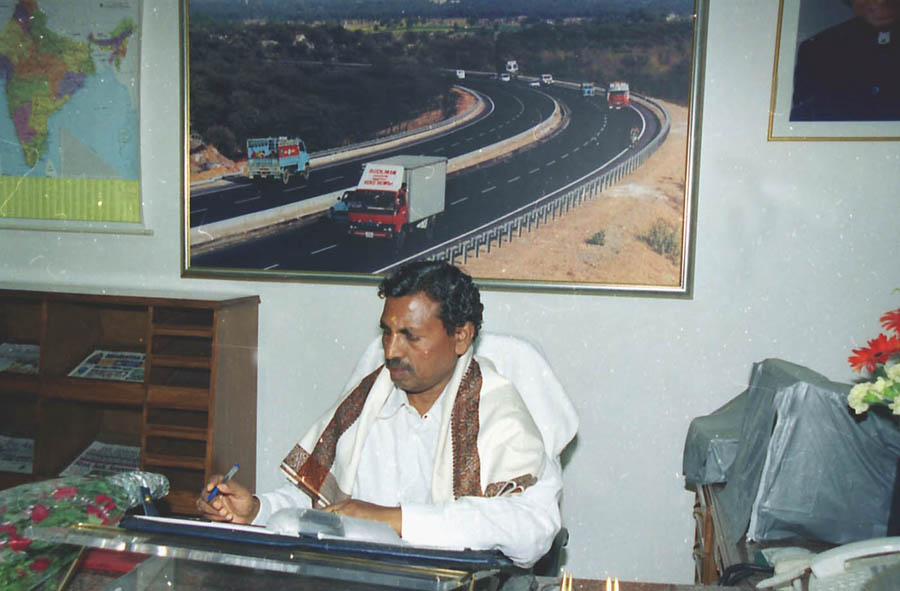

He was Minister of state in Government of India from 22 May 2004 to 28 October 2012.

Muniyappa was the Union Minister of state for Minister of Micro, Small and Medium Enterprises. He was administered the oath of office along with 59 other ministers on 28 May 2009 by President of India Pratibha Patil.

His son in law Sashidhar JE was made a secretary 2 of Vidhana Soudha, when the post was already running and the Speaker has sought a clarification after a protest by BJP.

== Awards ==
- He was awarded an Honorary Doctorate at the 32nd Annual Convocation of Gulbarga University in 2014.

== Elections Contested ==
=== Lok Sabha ===
Year	Constituency	Party	Votes	%	Opponent	Opponent Party	Opponent Votes	%	Result	Margin	%
2019	Kolar	INC	499,144	39.66	S. Muniswamy	BJP	709,165	56.35	Lost	-210,021	-16.69
2014	Kolar	INC	418,926	37.16	Kolar Kesava	JD(S)	375,076	32.92	Won	47,850	4.24
2009	Kolar	INC	344,771	37.17	D. S. Veeraiah	BJP	321,765	34.69	Won	23,006	2.48
2004	Kolar	INC	385,582	42.40	D. S. Veeraiah	BJP	373,947	41.12	Won	11,635	1.28
1999	Kolar	INC	321,964	39.47	G Mangamma	BJP	239,182	29.32	Won	82,782	10.15
1998	Kolar	INC	304,261	39.62	Balaji Channaiah	JD	226,289	29.47	Won	77,972	10.15
1996	Kolar	INC	310,349	44.38	Balaji Channaiah	JD	293,307	41.95	Won	17,042	2.43
1991	Kolar	INC	235,902	40.14	V Hanumappa	BJP	173,525	29.53	Won	62,377	10.61

=== Karnataka Legislative Assembly ===
Year	Constituency	Party	Votes	%	Opponent	Opponent Party	Opponent Votes	%	Result	Margin	%
2023	Devanahalli	INC	73,058	39.66	L. N. Nisarga Narayanaswamy	JD(S)	68,427	37.90	Won	4,631	2.56
