= Y. Ramakka =

Indian politician (born 1954)

Y. Ramakka (born 1954) is an Indian politician from Karnataka. She is elected as a Member of the Legislative Assembly in 2013 from Kolar Gold Field Assembly constituency representing the Bharatiya Janata Party.

== Early life and education ==
Ramakka is from Jigani hobli, Anekal taluk. She completed her SSLC in 1968 from Government High School, Kallubalu, Jigani. She is the daughter of Yallappa T. Her son Y Sampangi is also a former MLA.

== Career ==
Ramakka first became an MLA winning the 2013 Karnataka Legislative Assembly election from Kolar Gold Field Assembly constituency representing the Bharatiya Janata Party. She polled 55,014 votes and defeated her nearest rival, M. Backthavachalam of Janata Dal (S), by a margin of 26,022 votes.
