= M. Mallesh Babu =

Indian politician

Member of Parliament, Lok Sabha
- Incumbent
- Assumed office 4 June 2024
- Preceded by: S. Muniswamy
- Constituency: Kolar

Personal details
- Born: 30 June 1974 (age 51) Kumbarahalli village, Kolar, Kolar District, Karnataka
- Party: Janata Dal (Secular)
- Spouse: Manjula (m.14 February 2005)
- Children: 1 Son
- Parent(s): C. Muniswamy, G. Mangamma

Muniswamy Mallesh Babu is an Indian politician. He has been elected to Lok Sabha from Kolar Lok Sabha constituency. He is a member of Janata Dal (Secular).
