= M. C. Narasimhan =

Indian communist politician and trade unionist (died 2020)

M. C. Narasimhan (died 10 June 2020) was an Indian communist politician and trade unionist and leader of Communist Party of India. He worked for the cause of mine workers at Kolar Gold Fields and was elected MLA from there in 1957. He also was member at Karnataka Legislative Council.
