= Chintamani taluk =

Chintamani Taluk Chikkaballapur, Karnataka
- Taluk
- Location in Karnataka, India Chintamani Taluk (India)
- Coordinates: 13.4015°N 78.0549°E
- Country: India
- State: Karnataka
- District: Chikkaballapur

Area
  - Total: 867 km^{2} (335 sq mi)

Population (As per 2001 Census)
  - Total: 271,284

Languages
  - Official: Kannada
  - Others: Telugu, Urdu
- Time zone: UTC+5:30 (IST)
- PIN: 563 125
- Telephone code: 0815x-xxxxxx
- Vehicle registration: KA67

Chintamani Taluk Map

Also refer to Chintamani

== Span ==
Taluk at a glance
Taluk	Villages (1991)		Total	Gram Panchayats (2001–02)	As per 2001 census				
Taluk	Inhabited	Uninhabited	Total	Gram Panchayats (2001–02)	Hoblies	Villages	Town Panchayats	Town Municipality	City Municipal Council
Chintamani	344	63	407	34	6	400	0	0	1

Hobli Wise Breakup
Taluk	Hobli	Villages (2001)	Span in Hectares (2001)
Chintamani	Ambajidurga	74	14,904.18
Chintamani	Kaiwara	49	10,066.24
Chintamani	Chintamani	71	14,003.17
Chintamani	Chilakalanerpu	65	18,629.21
Chintamani	Munganahalli	55	15,851.97
Chintamani	Muragamalla	86	14,229.01
Total		400	87,683.78

== Demography ==
Population at a glance(As per 2001 Population Census)
Description	Total	Male	Female
Total	2,71,284	1,38,311	1,32,973
Villages	2,05,791	1,04,466	1,01,325
Chintamani City	65,493	33,845	31,648

== Education ==
Glance at Elementary Schools
Education Department		Social Welfare		Local Body		Aided		Un Aided		Central		Others		Total		
LPS	HPS	LPS	HPS	LPS	HPS	LPS	HPS	LPS	HPS	LPS	HPS	LPS	HPS	LPS	HPS	Total
215	127	1	3	0	0	0	13	6	54	0	1	0	0	222	198	420

- LPS – Lower Primary School
- HPS – Higher Primary School

== Religious tourism ==
- Kaivara kshetra, South Westerly
- Kailasagiri cave and Ambaji Durga cave temple, South Westerly
- Lakshmi Venkataramana temple, Alamgiri, Southerly
- Murugamulla: Fakhi Shah Wali Dargah and Muktheshwara swami temple, Easterly
