= Bangarapet =

Bangarapet Bangarapete Bowringpet
- Town
- Location in Karnataka, India
- Coordinates: 12.97°N 78.2°E
- Country: India
- State: Karnataka
- District: Kolar

Area
  - Total: 5.5 km^{2} (2.1 sq mi)
- Elevation: 843 m (2,766 ft)

Population (2011)
  - Total: 44,849
  - Density: 8,200/km^{2} (21,000/sq mi)

Languages
  - Official: Kannada
- Time zone: UTC+5:30 (IST)
- PIN: 563114
- Telephone code: 08153
- Vehicle registration: KA-07, KA-08
- Website: bangarpettown.mrc.gov.in

Bangarapet or Bangāra pete is a town in Kolar district in the state of Karnataka, India. Bangarapet is the headquarters of the taluk of Bangarapet. Bangarapet was originally called Bowringpet, named after an officer working in the Kolar Gold Fields. This town came into existence as the connecting point of traffic between the gold fields.

== Road ==
Bangarpet is connected by State Highway No. 5 up to Kolar and then by National Highway No. 48 up to Bangalore. The distance through road is approximately 90 km. It takes about 15 km to get connected to NH48 (Delhi-Pune-Bangalore-Chennai highway) & 30 km to next nearest town, Kuppam in Andhra Pradesh.

== Railway ==
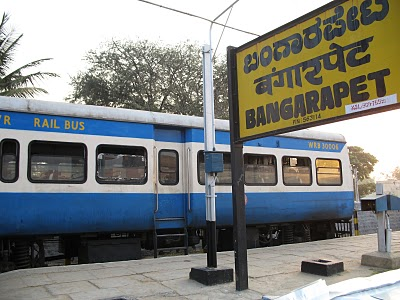
Bangarapet

The Bangarapet railway station is the last major railway junction in Karnataka before the Bangalore-Chennai line enters Andhra Pradesh and Tamil Nadu. Bangarpet is approximately 71 km from Bangalore via train. People travelling to Kolar Gold Fields (KGF) need to change trains here while travelling in trains bound to Bangalore or Chennai.

== Administration ==
Bangarapet is a City Municipal Council with 27 municipal wards, where each ward is represented by a councilor directly elected by the people. Councillors elect the president and vice president among themselves.

== Demographics ==
Bangarapet is a Town Municipal Council city in the district of Kolar, Karnataka. The Bangarapet city is divided into 23 wards for which elections are held every 5 years. The Bangarapet Town Municipal Council has population of 44,849, of which 22,628 are males while 22,221 are females as per report released by Census India 2011.

The population of children age 0-6 is 5,139, which is 11.46% of total population of Bangarapet (TMC). In the Bangarapet Town Municipal Council, the female sex ratio is of 982, compared to the state average of 973. Moreover, the child sex ratio in Bangarapet is around 946 compared to the Karnataka state average of 948. The literacy rate of Bangarapet is 86.69%; which is higher than the state average of 75.36%. In Bangarapet, the male literacy rate is around 90.58% while the female literacy rate is 82.74%.

The Bangarapet Town Municipal Council has total administration over 10,083 houses to which it supplies basic amenities like water and sewage. It is also authorized to build roads within Town Municipal Council limits and impose taxes on properties coming under its jurisdiction.

Caste Factor Schedule Caste (SC) constitutes 23.09% while Schedule Tribe (ST) were 1.00% of total population in Bangarapet (TMC).

Out of the total population, 15,999 people were engaged in work or business activity. Of this, 12,562 were males, while 3,437 were females. In the census survey, a worker is defined as person who does business, job, service, and cultivator and labour activity. Of the total working population, 88.17% were engaged in main work while 11.83% of total workers were engaged in marginal work.

The people of Bangarapet depend largely on jobs in Bangalore for earning money. People generally work in IT and private companies in and around Bangalore. The town is very well connected with Bangalore, facilitating in a huge daily population travelling to Bangalore to earn their living. A portion of the people work in the nearby public sector factory of Bharath Earth Movers Limited.

=== Languages ===
Languages of Bangarapet (2011)
1. Urdu (29.5%)
2. Kannada (25.6%)
3. Telugu (20.2%)
4. Tamil (21.0%)
5. Hindi (1.98%)
6. Marathi (1.22%)
7. Malayalam (0.34%)
8. Others (0.19%)

== Culture ==
This town is known in Karnataka for Bangarpet chats, especially Pani-puri and it's also known for its rice trading.

== Notable people ==
- Picchalli Srinivas – popular singer and theatre personality
