= Chintamani, Karnataka =

Chintamani
- Town
- Location in Karnataka, India
- Coordinates: 13.400°N 78.066°E
- Country: India
- State: Karnataka
- District: Chikkaballapur
- Taluk: Chintamani
- Municipality Established: 28 November 1938
- Founder: Chintamani Rao
- Named for: Gold & Silver Trade, Tomatoes, Mangoes, Snacks, Ground nut

Government
  - Type: Municipal Council
  - Body: City Municipal Council
  - Municipal Commissioner: B.Mahesh Kumar
  - MLA (Current): Dr. M C. Sudhakar

Area of 867 km2
  - Total: 15.208 km^{2} (5.872 sq mi)
- Elevation: 865 m (2,838 ft)

Population (As per 2011 Census)
  - Total: 76,068
  - Density: 5,001.84/km^{2} (12,954.7/sq mi)

Languages
  - Official: Kannada

Temperature
  - Summer: 28 °C to 34 °C
  - Winter: 20 °C to 25 °C
- Time zone: UTC+5:30 (IST)
- PIN: 563 125
- STD Code: 08154-25xxxx
- Vehicle registration: KA-67

Chintamani Taluk Map

Chintamani is a Taluk Headquarters in the Indian state of Karnataka, located on the Deccan Plateau in the south-eastern part of the state. Chintamani is one of the well-planned and developed towns in the District of Kolar (before splitting) and presently Chikkaballapur. Chintamani is known for its silk and tomato production and its largest markets in Karnataka.

== Etymology ==
The word 'Chintamani' refers to a precious stone or gem that has been documented for centuries in the Hindu Scriptures and Literature. However, the naming of the town as 'Chintamani' (wish-fulfilling jewel) has no relevance this gem.

== History ==
=== Before 19th Century ===
The Town of Chintamani along with the District of Kolar has been part of the continuous rule of numerous kingdoms and rulers that include Cholas, Vijayanagar Empire, Gangas, Mysore Wodeyars, Palegaras, Tippu Sultan, British and many local chieftains. This area during the 12th Century was under the rule of Kōpparakēsarivarman Vikrama Chola of the Chola dynasty.

During the reign of the British, the town was called by name CHINTOMNIPETT. The document A Gazetteer of the Territories Under The Government of India on document page no. 204 reads...

CHINTOMNIPETT. – A town in Mysore, distant N.E. from Bangalore 43 miles. Lat. 13° 23″, long. 78° 6″

CHINTOMNIPETT in British accent could have been CHINTAMANIPETE (ಚಿಂತಾಮಣಿ ಪೇಟೆ), in local Indian accent.

However, as per the known history, the Maratha Chieftain Chintamani Rao was last in line to rule the locality of Chintamani. It is said that the Town has been named after the Chieftain. Apart from this, nothing much is known either about this person or his achievements.

There are a few buildings and monuments available which stand as historical evidence. There is no valid information available about these. Some of them include:

Kalyani Near Railway Station

Inscription at Vasavi Temple on Ganigara Veedi

Inscription at Vasavi Temple on Ganigara Veedi

1. The fort-like construction and watchtower on Anjanadri Hill
2. Forts on the hill tops at Ambajidurga, Kaiwara, and other villages nearby
3. Inscription at Vasavi Kanyakaparameshwari Temple on Ganigara Veedhi
4. Architecture and construction features of some temples, such as Naganatheshwara Temple, Vasavi Kanyaparameshwari Temple
5. The old temple at Alambagiri and writings found there
6. Street Lamps at Azad Chowk belonging to the time of British (Currently only one of them can be seen in front of Hurigadale Shop)
7. The Chintamani Cooperative Society Building on Double Road built around 1930's built during British
8. The Drinking Water Fountain at Bangalore Circle in front of the Guru Bhavana
9. Kalyanis at Ramakunte and near Railway Station
10. Some identification names in use - for example : the name Ambajidurga. Ambaji is a Maratha name, while durga is a common Kannada word used for hills, as in Chitradurga

Below is a list of some citations that are available in some literature and research documents.

At Chintamani (Andhra) in 1231, the Devanga 'ten thousand' in the presence of their deity Ramayadeva and goddess......

from the Textiles and weavers in medieval South India by Vijaya Ramaswamy. It is to be noted that Chintamani shares the border with Andhra Pradesh.

=== Post 19th Century ===
Most of the temples currently seen and being offered worship have been built mostly during the 19th Century. Listed below are the few monuments that narrate the history of the place.

1. Sri Hari Hareshwara Temple, Azad Chowk – this temple was built around the 19th century by Sri Karupakula Subbarayappa. The temple later received restoration and alteration works by the family members. The temple spans over an area of around 25,000 square feet (160 ft x 150 ft). The temple is surrounded by a commercial complex on its east side, while the other sides are bounded by a high wall. Within the temple complex are the temples dedicated to the Hindu deities Lord Shiva and Lord Vishnu. Most of the Sabarimala Trips originate at this temple by offering the various rituals and attaining the pence (diksha).

== Geography ==
=== Geographical Location ===
Chintamani lies in the southeast of the South Indian state of Karnataka. It is in the heart of the Mysore Plateau at an average elevation of 865 m (2,838 ft). The Taluk geographically lies between 78°12′36″N 13°16′38″E and 77°51′39″N 13°42′00″E. The Chintamani Town lies between 13.40°N 78.06°E.

Chintamani was originally a part of Kolar District since the Formation of state of Karnataka in 1950 until 23 August 2007, when the Government of Karnataka carved out the new district of Chikkaballapur from the old Kolar district. Chintamani was then included into the new district of Chikkaballapur. Chintamani is one among the 6 Taluks of Chikkaballapur District. The Taluk Headquarters which is Chintamani Town is 36 km from the District Headquarters Chikkaballapur and about 74 km from State Capital Karnataka. The Taluk is bounded by Sidlaghatta on West, Bagepalli on North-West, Kolar on South-West, Srinivaspur on South-East and Anantapur district of Andhra Pradesh on East.

=== Span ===
The Taluk covers an area of 892 km^{2}; the town or the Chintamani Hobbli constitutes 15.208 km^{2} (5.872 mi^{2}) of the total area.

=== Climate and Rainfall ===
Chintamani falls in the Tropical Semi-Arid (Steppe) type of climatic region of India. The climate here is moderately hot and dry. The months of March to May of the summer season are very hot with temperatures of around 38 °C. The region receives very little rainfall of about 40 to 75 cm annually. The area receives rainfall during both Southwest monsoon and Northeast monsoon Season.

Climate data for Chintamani (1991–2020)
Month	Jan	Feb	Mar	Apr	May	Jun	Jul	Aug	Sep	Oct	Nov	Dec	Year
Record high °C (°F)	33.0 (91.4)	34.9 (94.8)	38.0 (100.4)	40.0 (104.0)	39.3 (102.7)	38.0 (100.4)	33.7 (92.7)	32.5 (90.5)	35.6 (96.1)	33.6 (92.5)	31.3 (88.3)	30.9 (87.6)	40.0 (104.0)
Mean daily maximum °C (°F)	28.3 (82.9)	30.6 (87.1)	33.4 (92.1)	35.2 (95.4)	34.7 (94.5)	31.6 (88.9)	30.0 (86.0)	29.5 (85.1)	29.4 (84.9)	29.1 (84.4)	27.4 (81.3)	26.8 (80.2)	30.4 (86.7)
Mean daily minimum °C (°F)	14.4 (57.9)	15.6 (60.1)	18.5 (65.3)	20.8 (69.4)	21.5 (70.7)	20.8 (69.4)	20.4 (68.7)	20.3 (68.5)	20.0 (68.0)	19.2 (66.6)	17.1 (62.8)	15.1 (59.2)	18.6 (65.5)
Record low °C (°F)	5.3 (41.5)	7.0 (44.6)	10.2 (50.4)	13.5 (56.3)	16.9 (62.4)	17.5 (63.5)	18.6 (65.5)	18.2 (64.8)	16.5 (61.7)	11.8 (53.2)	7.4 (45.3)	7.5 (45.5)	5.3 (41.5)
Average rainfall mm (inches)	1.2 (0.05)	2.6 (0.10)	13.7 (0.54)	36.0 (1.42)	94.4 (3.72)	63.6 (2.50)	82.1 (3.23)	114.0 (4.49)	150.7 (5.93)	170.4 (6.71)	66.3 (2.61)	15.7 (0.62)	810.7 (31.92)
Average rainy days	0.2	0.3	1.0	2.1	5.2	4.2	5.9	6.2	6.8	7.5	4.2	1.4	45.1
Average relative humidity (%) (at 17:30 IST)	46	38	38	37	48	58	61	65	64	65	65	60	54
Source: India Meteorological Department

=== Soil ===
The Taluk mostly consists of Clayey-Loam Soil. This soil has moisture-retention capacity and allows deep furrowing and is suitable for cultivation of cereals, vegetables, and pulses.

=== Rivers ===
The Taluk does not have any perennial rivers. River Papagni has got its catchment basin on the hills of Ambajidurga. Over the years, the basin has got completely ruined with no vegetation and with soil erosion. Recently, under National Rural Employment Guarantee Act (NREGA) guidelines about 73,111 plants have been planted and are being nurtured to improve the conditions at the catchment basin and inflow of the once existing river.

=== Water Resources ===
Chintamani has a few large lakes that take care of the Town's thirst for water. Kanampalli Lake is the main water reservoir for the town. Other lakes include – Ambajidurga Lake, Gopasandra Lake, Malapalli Lake, and Nekkundipete Lake. Under the 100 Crore Grant Scheme, these lakes are being rejuvenated and storage is being upgraded with modern facilities.

== Civic Administration ==
The Taluk falls under Bangalore Division and Chikkaballapur Sub-Division. The Taluk consists of 6 hobblies – Chintamani, Ambajidurga, Kaivara, Muragamalla, Munganahalli and Chilakalanerpu. Of these, Chintamani Hobbli forms the Chintamani Town. The 6 hobblies together have around 339 villages.

The Taluk Administration lies with the Taluk Panchayat, which will oversee the implementation and progress of the developmental activities and schemes, while executive officer, Taluk Panchayat looks after the administration. The executive officer reports to the chief executive officer of the Zilla Panchayat.

The Chintamani Municipality was constituted on 28 November 1938. In the year 1995, it was reconstituted to form City Municipal Council. The City Council currently contains 31 wards each represented by a Councillor.

Ward List , Abbagundu, Anjani Extension, Bamboo Bazaar, Chowda reddy Palya, Halepete, Huvina Pete, JJ Colony, Kanampalli, Kolar Cross, Kolar Road, KR Extension, Malapalli, Mehaboob Nagar, Narashimha Pete, Nekundhipete, NNT Temple Behind, NR Extension, Patalamma Temple Road, Shanti Nagar, Sri Rama Nagar, Sonashetty Halli, Tank Bund Road, Tank Bund Road East, Thimmasandra, Tippu Nagar, Venkatagiri Kote 1, Venkatagiri Kote 2, Venkatagiri Kote 3, Venkateshwara Extension, Vinoba Colony, KGN colony, Nakundi pete

== Economy ==
The economy is agriculture-based. Chintamani is famous for its succulent tomatoes, onions, groundnuts, mangoes, bananas, and silk production. Chintamani is also famous for snacks such as chakli, nippat, groundnuts, and others. The Chintamani Tomato Market is one of the biggest in Karnataka. It is also famous for drinks like nannari. Chintamani plays its role even in the production and export of Agarbatti. It is also famous for its silk industry and dairy milk farms.

== Transport ==
=== Bus Service ===
The town falls under the KSRTC wing of the State Transport Department. Chintamani has a state of the art KSRTC Bus Service. Over the past few decades there has been a large Bus Depot and Bus Terminus in the town, well located, maintained and periodically upgraded/developed by the authorities. All the routes operational from the town have a computerized ticketing system in place since last few years. Proposals for the GPS Tracking are under consideration and due implementation shortly. In addition, private buses have added to the efficiency of road transport in Chintamani.

The town is served mostly through the Suvarna Karnataka Sarige type of KSRTC Buses. The mostly catered route outside the district is Chintamani – Bangalore. Apart from this there are numerous routes that cater to many of the important towns & cities around that include – Mysore, Chitradurga, Shimoga, Tirupati, Hindupur, Gowribidanur etc. There are a number of routes that connect the town with the adjacent town of the Chikkaballapur and Kolar Districts.

The KSRTC has provided its employees with Residential Quarters and required amenities at a prominent location in the town. As well the town has one of the main depots in the region.

In the recent years, there has been a greater involvement by the authorities in the upgrading of the Transport Facilities. As part of this, the main Bus Terminus on the Chelur Road has been modified in phase manners to include – RCC flooring, improved bus shelters, public toilets, commercial shops, signage and information systems. As well there have been Bus Stops constructed at every village and town on the route between Chintamani – Bangalore as part of this project. And local bus service is being implementation with the goal to serve the local villages and nearby places of importance on the lines of BMTC.

Apart from State Transport Corporation, the area has a number of private players, which cover many of the routes as well along with some of those that are not covered by the KSRTC.

The KSRTC Bus Depot is located on the Bangalore Road and that of the Bus Terminus near the Chelur Circle. The KSRTC Residential Quarters are located adjacent to the KSRTC Bus Depot.

=== Railways ===
Chintamani
- Railway Station Construction View

Overview
- Owner: India Railways
- Locale: Chintamani, Karnataka
- Number of lines: 3
- Number of stations: 1

Operation
- Operation will start: November 2013
- Operator: South western Railways

Technical
- Track gauge: Broad Gauge

The Chintamani Railway Station which was once a busy terminal, before the advent of bus service, had been neglected during the course of time and the services were completely halted since last few decades.

Recently after due proposals and requests from the general public, the Railway Authorities decided to restart the service and the repair of the existing tracks and stations was taken up. Very soon, the Railways ordered the up gradation of the Narrow Gauge to Broad Gauge and the entire work soon took a sharp swing.

By 2013 November, the New Station in Chintamani Town was in final stages of completion, whereas the track work between Chintamani-Srinivaspur was under testing. The services were started in the month of November 2013.

The Chintamani Station is abbreviated as CMY on the railway station index. The Train Service is called Demu with six coaches being operational.

The train departs from Bangalore City Railway Station at 8:30 am and reaches Chintamani via Chickballapur and Shidlaghatta en route to Kolar by noon. On the reverse trip, the train departs from Kolar by 2:00 pm and comes to Chintamani by 2:40 pm. It departs by 2:45 pm and reaches Bangalore City Railway Station by 5:30 pm.

There is a demand that one more train should be introduced on this route with an early morning departure from Kolar around 6 am, coming to Chintamani around 7 am and reaching Bangalore city around 9:30 am to serve commuters from Chintamani to Bangalore.

=== Airways ===
The town does not have any airports or helipads at present. The nearest airport is the Bengaluru International Airport, Devanahalli, 62 km away.

== Demographics ==
Population at a glance(As per 2001 Population Census)
Description	Total	Male	Female
Total	2,71,284	1,38,311	1,32,973
Villages	2,05,791	1,04,466	1,01,325
Chintamani City	65,493	33,845	31,648

== Culture ==
Since the place is surrounded by two different states, the culture here is majorly Kannada influenced by Telugu (Rayalaseema) culture. Chinthamani is also famous for the evening snacks, especially roasted peanuts, and a variety of sweets.

== Education ==
As per the latest reports of the Department of Public Instruction of Karnataka, the [Chintamani Taluk|Taluk of Chintamani] has a total of 420 registered schools, of which 222 are Lower Primary Schools and the remaining198 are Higher Primary Schools. This list is inclusive of all the schools run by Education Department, Social Welfare Boards, Local Bodies, Aided, Un Aided, Central, Others.

Below is the list of schools located in the City of Chintamani

List of Private Schools(As per Department of Public Instruction, Government of Karnataka)
Sl	Name	Trust Incharge	Location	Lower & Higher Primary School	High School
1	Kishora Vidya Bhavana	Chintamani Educational Trust	Bangalore Road	*	*
2	Jyothi English Medium School		Madikere	*	*
3	Anantha Vidhayala Samsthe			*	
4	Chethana Vidya Samathe			*	*
5	Diligence Composite High School		Chelur road	*	*
6	Dolphins Delhi Public School			*	
7	Kempe Gowda School			*	*
8	Kinder Garten School		Anjani Extension	*	
9	Kittur Rani Channamma School			*	
10	Little Lords School			*	
11	LPS			*	
12	Mathrushri Primary School			*	
13	MKB Public School			*	*
14	MWA School	Muslim Welfare Association	KR Extension	*	*
15	Nalanda		Bangalore Road	*	
16	Naveen Vidya Samsthe			*	
17	New Modern School			*	
18	New Public School		Bangalore Road	*	
19	Pavan School			*	
20	Pragathi Vidya Mandira	Sree Vinayaka Educational Trust	MG Road	*	*
21	Royal Convent	Royal Educational Trust	Anjani Extension	*	*
22	Sarvodaya English School			*	
23	SFS School			*	*
24	Shanthi Nikethana		Bangalore Road	*	
25	Shilpa School			*	*
26	SRET School		Bagepalli Road	*	*
27	Sri Jain Public School		Malapalli	*	
28	Sri Lal Bahadoor Memorial School			*	
29	Sri Vani English Convent	Vani Education Trust	Tank Bund Road	*	*
30	Sri Vishwa Bharathi			*	
31	Swathi Vidya Samsthe			*	
32	The Horizon School			*	*
33	The Preethi Public School	MG Road		*	*
34	Uday HPS			*	
35	Vani (Kannada) School	Vani Education Trust	Tank Bund Road	*	*
36	Vasavi Vidyanikethana	Vasavi Educational Trust	Diamond Taxies Road	*	
37	Vikram Composite High School	Sri Lakshmi Educational Society (R)	Chelur Road	*	
38	Adarsh Vidyalaya RMSA		*		
39	The Toddlers Montessori School		Anjani Extension	*	

== Religious Tourism ==
- Kaivara kshetra, South Westerly
- Kailasagiri and Ambaji Durga cave temple, South Westerly
- Lakshmi Venkataramana temple, Alamgiri, Southerly
- Murugamulla: Fakhi Shah Wali Dargah and Muktheshwara swami temple, Easterly
- Lakshmi Venkateshwara Temple, Konakuntlu.
- Sri Vasavi Temple, doddapet Chintamani (biggest vasavi temple in karnataka)
- Sri Brahmachaithanya Sri Rama Mandir, N R Extension, Chintamani Town
- Sri Kambalapalli SeethaRama sametha Anjaneya Swamy - Kambalapalli

== See also ==
- Dharmavarahalli
