= Tourism in India by state =

Tourism in India

Tourism plays a significant role in the Indian economy. According to the Ministry of Tourism, the sector contributed to 5.22% of India's GDP in 2023-24 (provisional estimates), recovering from pandemic lows of 1.50% in 2020–21 to pre-pandemic levels of around 5%. The World Travel and Tourism Council reported that India's travel and tourism sector contributed nearly Rs 21 trillion to the economy in 2024, supporting approximately 46.5 million jobs (9.1% of total employment).

States and Union territories of India with their names.

== Andaman and Nicobar Islands ==
The Andaman and Nicobar Islands, first settled around 26,000 years ago, form an archipelago of 572 tropical islands, of which only 37 are inhabited. Tourism plays a major economic role in the islands. According to official estimates, tourist arrivals tripled from 130,000 in 2016 to 430,000 in 2017.

The islands straddle the fault line between the Indo-Australian Plate and the Sunda Plate, and their topography reflects millions of years of volcanism and tectonics. Barren Island hosts South Asia's only active volcano, which typically erupts every one to two years; its most recent eruption occurred in 2024.

The most notable historical site is the Cellular Jail in Port Blair. Built in 1906 during the British Raj, it became notorious for its harsh conditions and use as a political prison for members of India's independence movement. The former prison complex now serves as a museum and memorial.

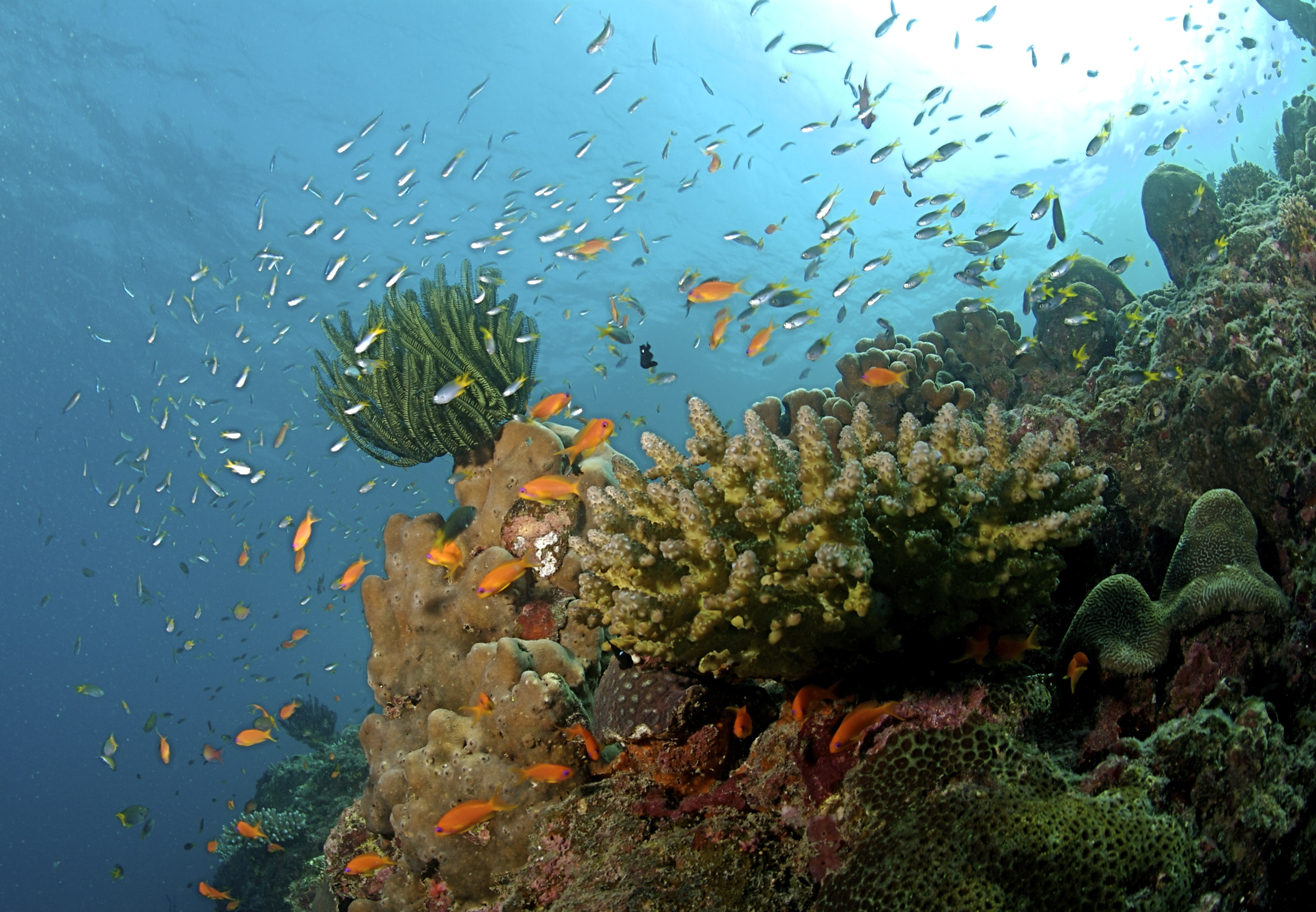
Coral reef near Jolly Buoy Island

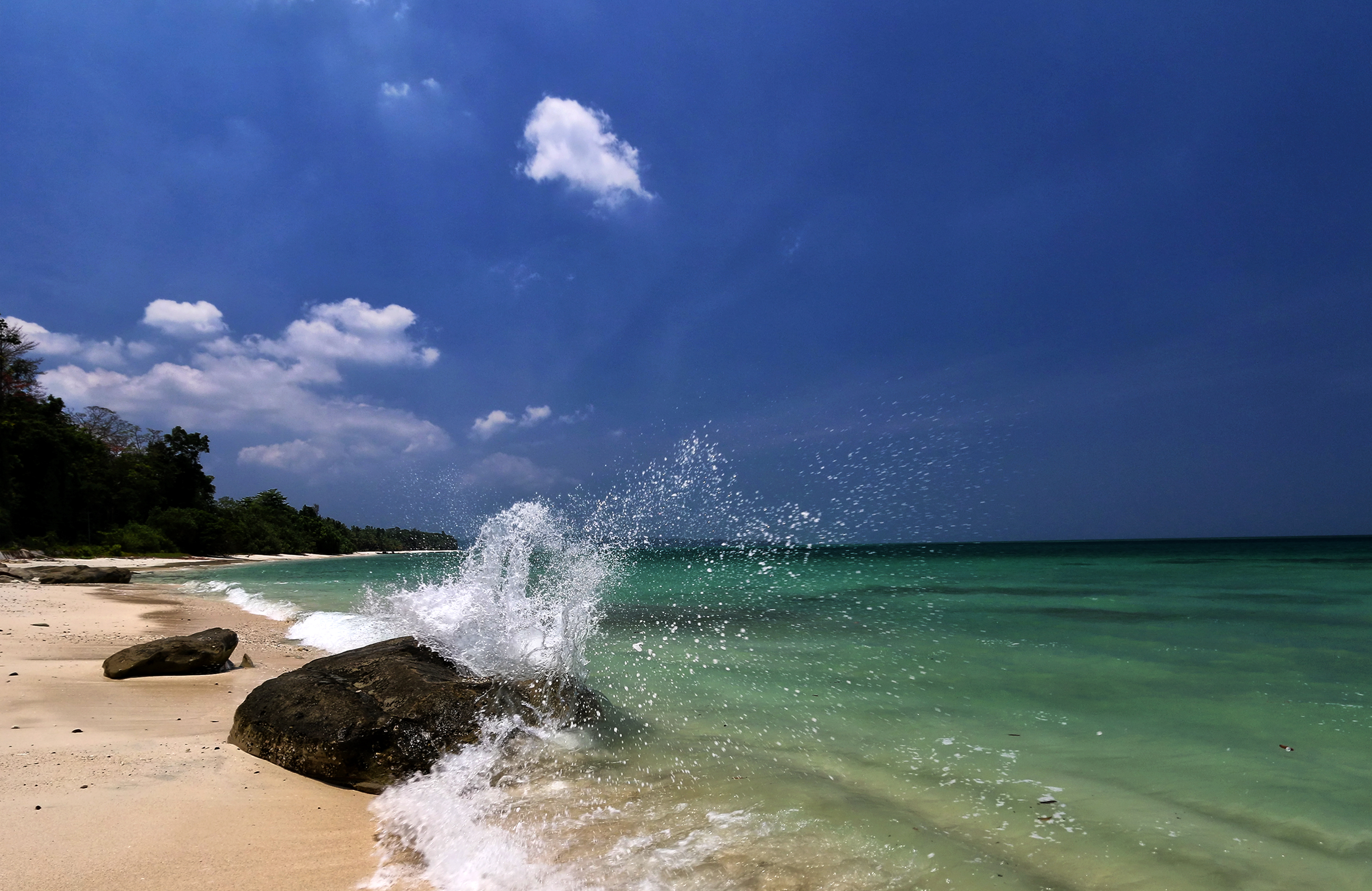
Beach on Havelock Island

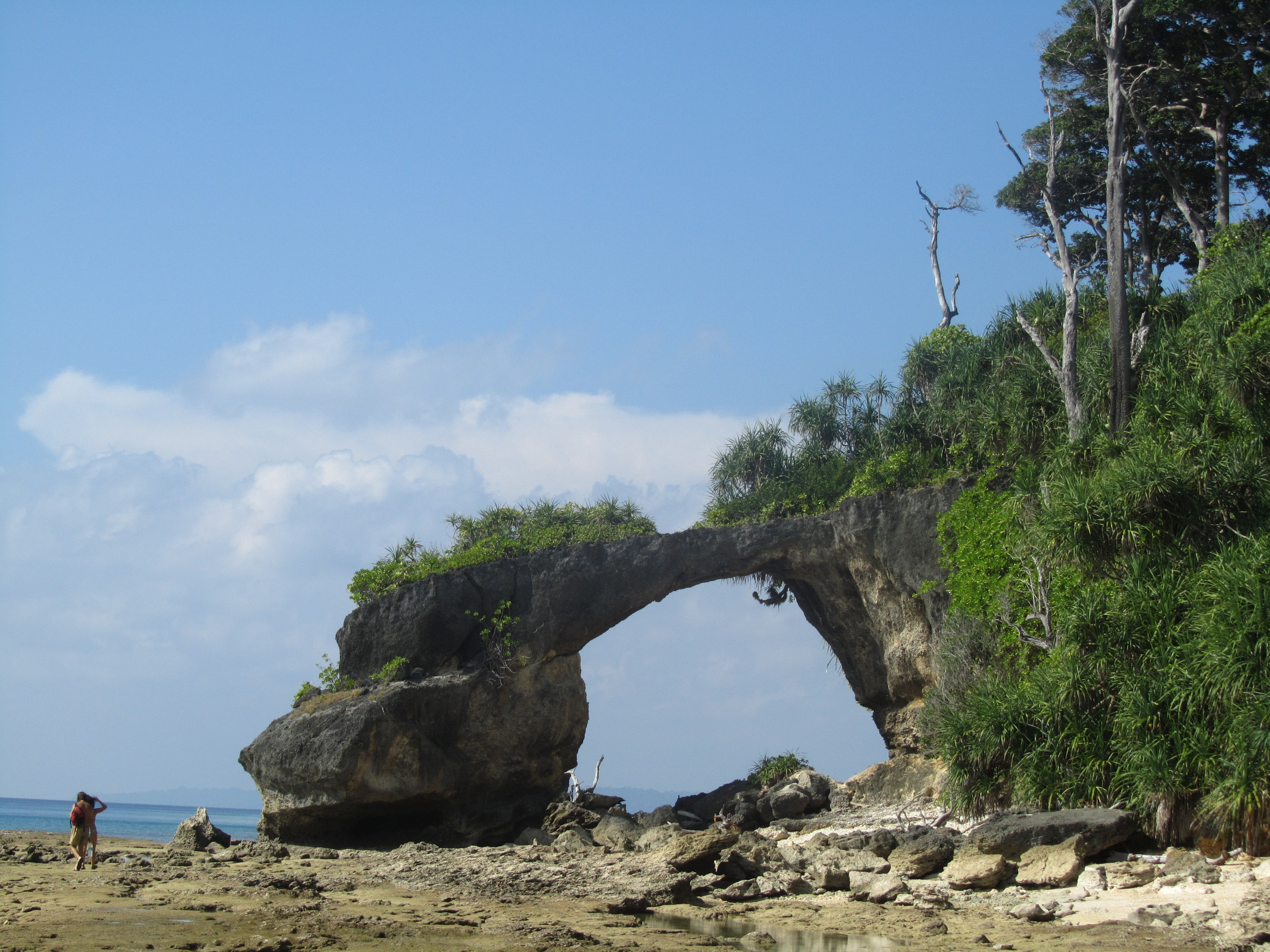
Natural bridge in Neil Island

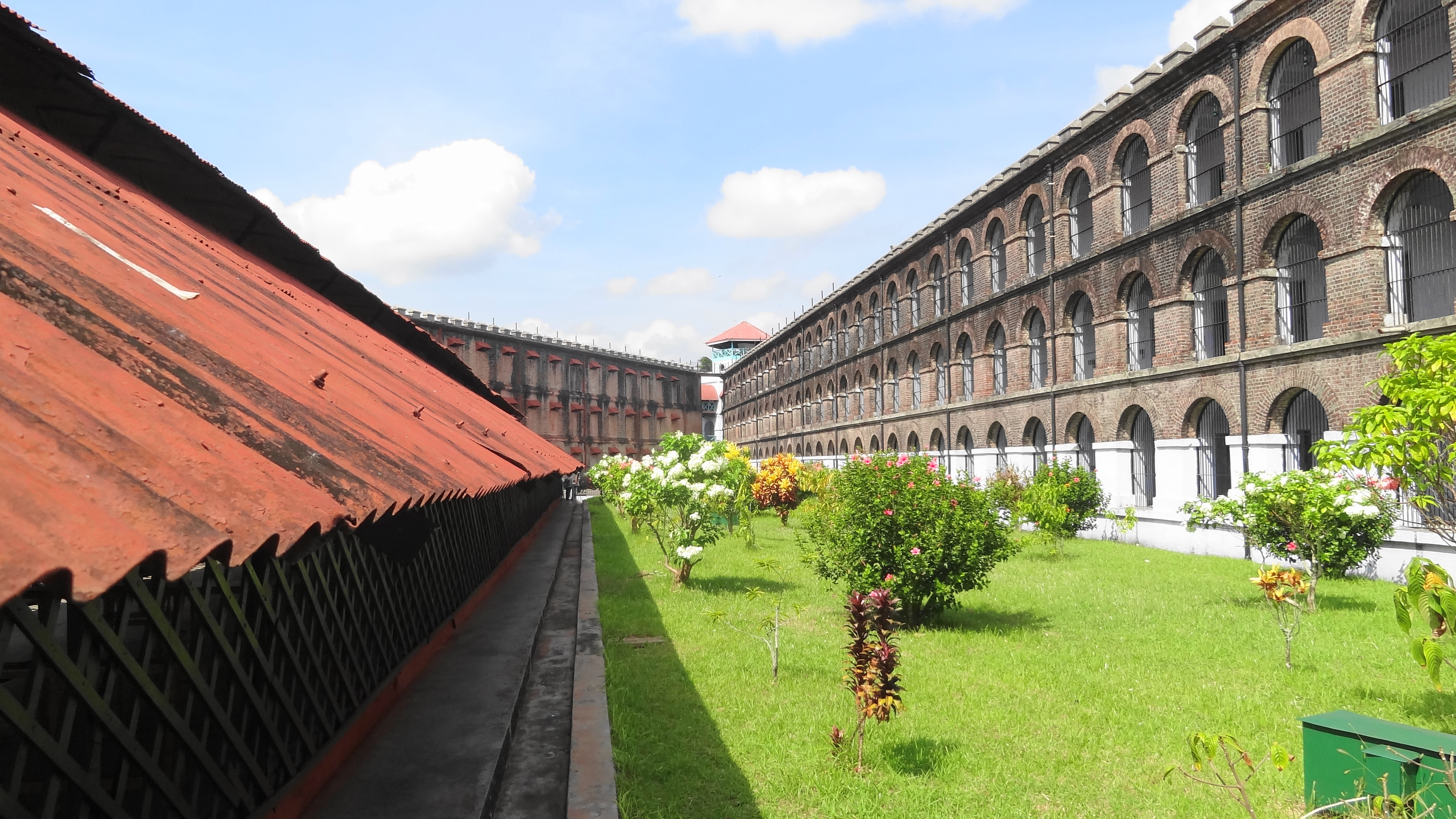
The Cellular Jail in Port Blair

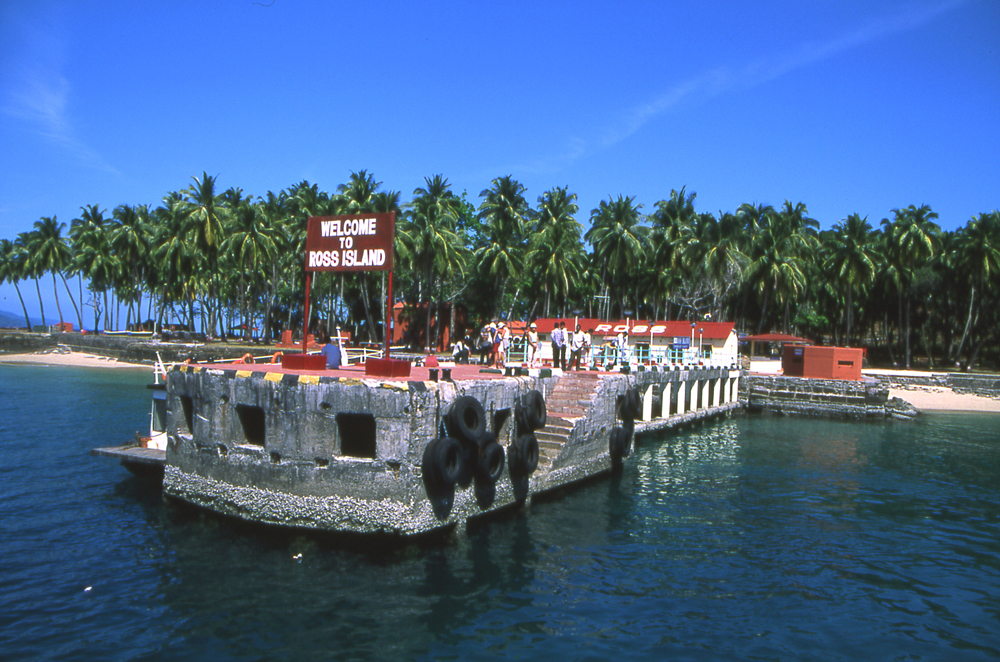
Landing on Ross Island

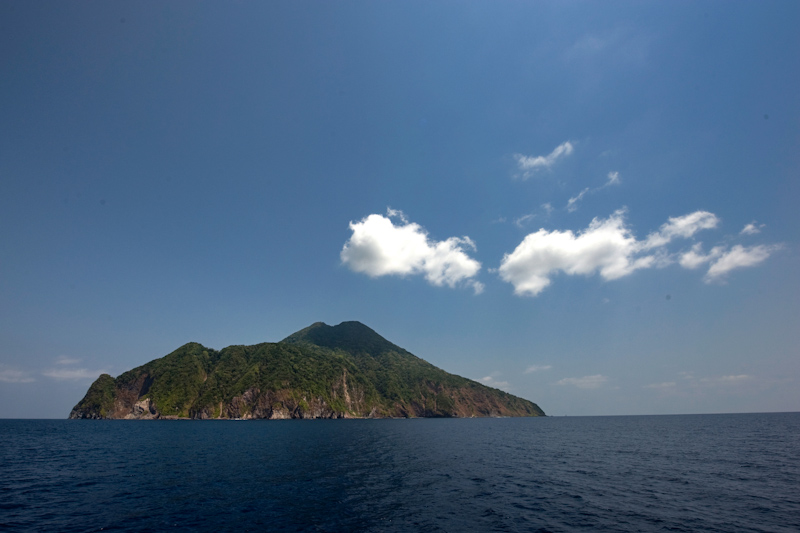
Nicobar Island from offshore

== Andhra Pradesh ==
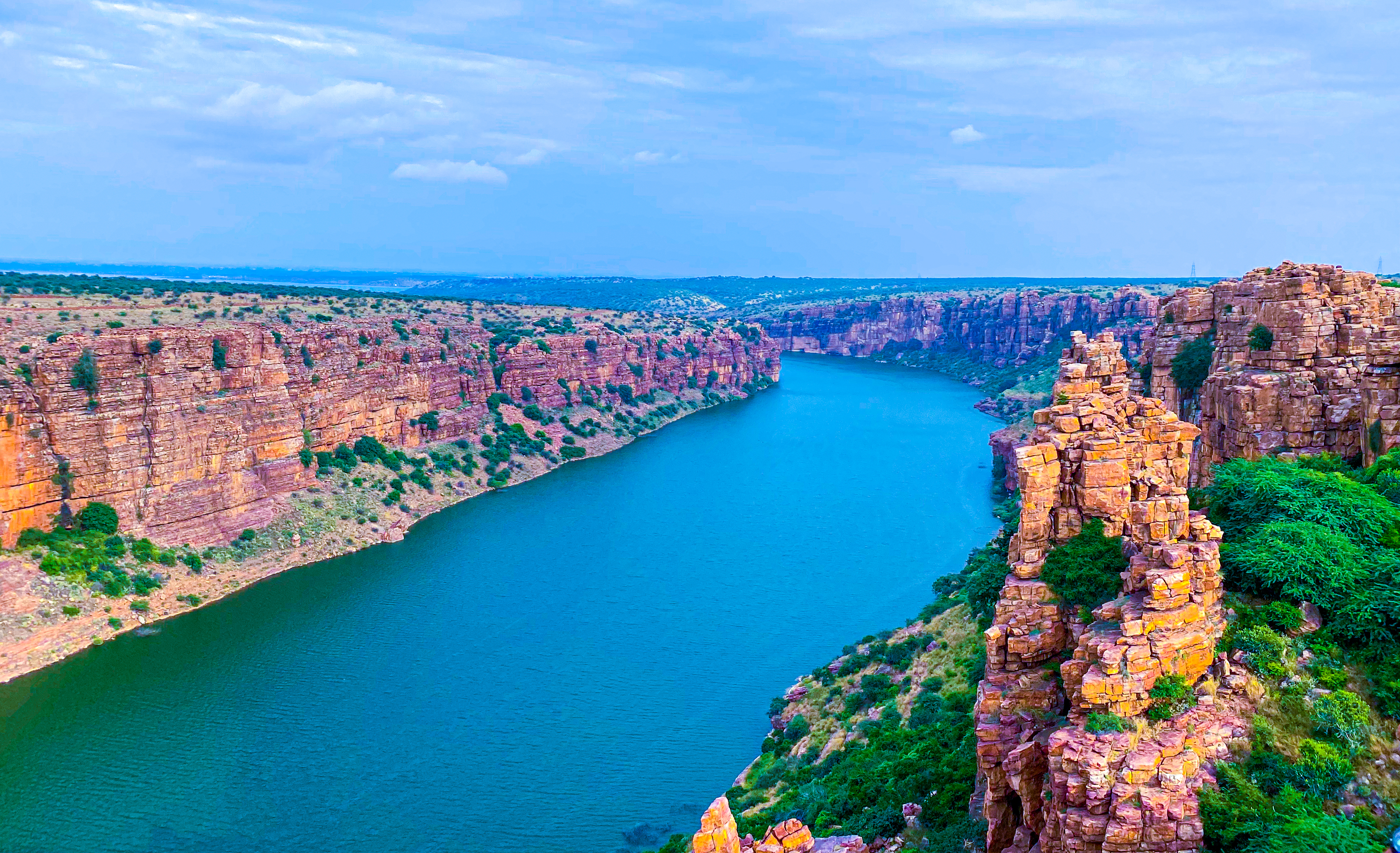
Gandikota canyon

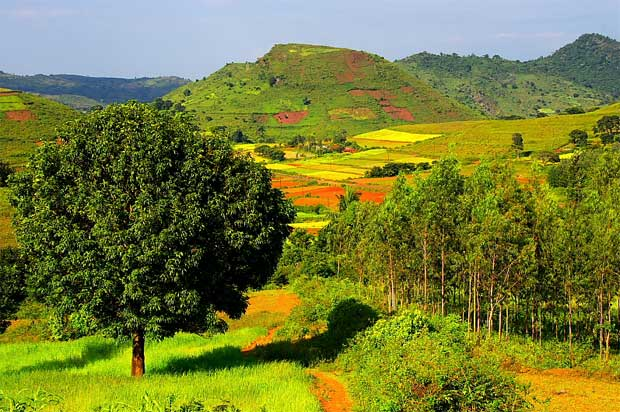
Araku Valley near Visakhapatnam

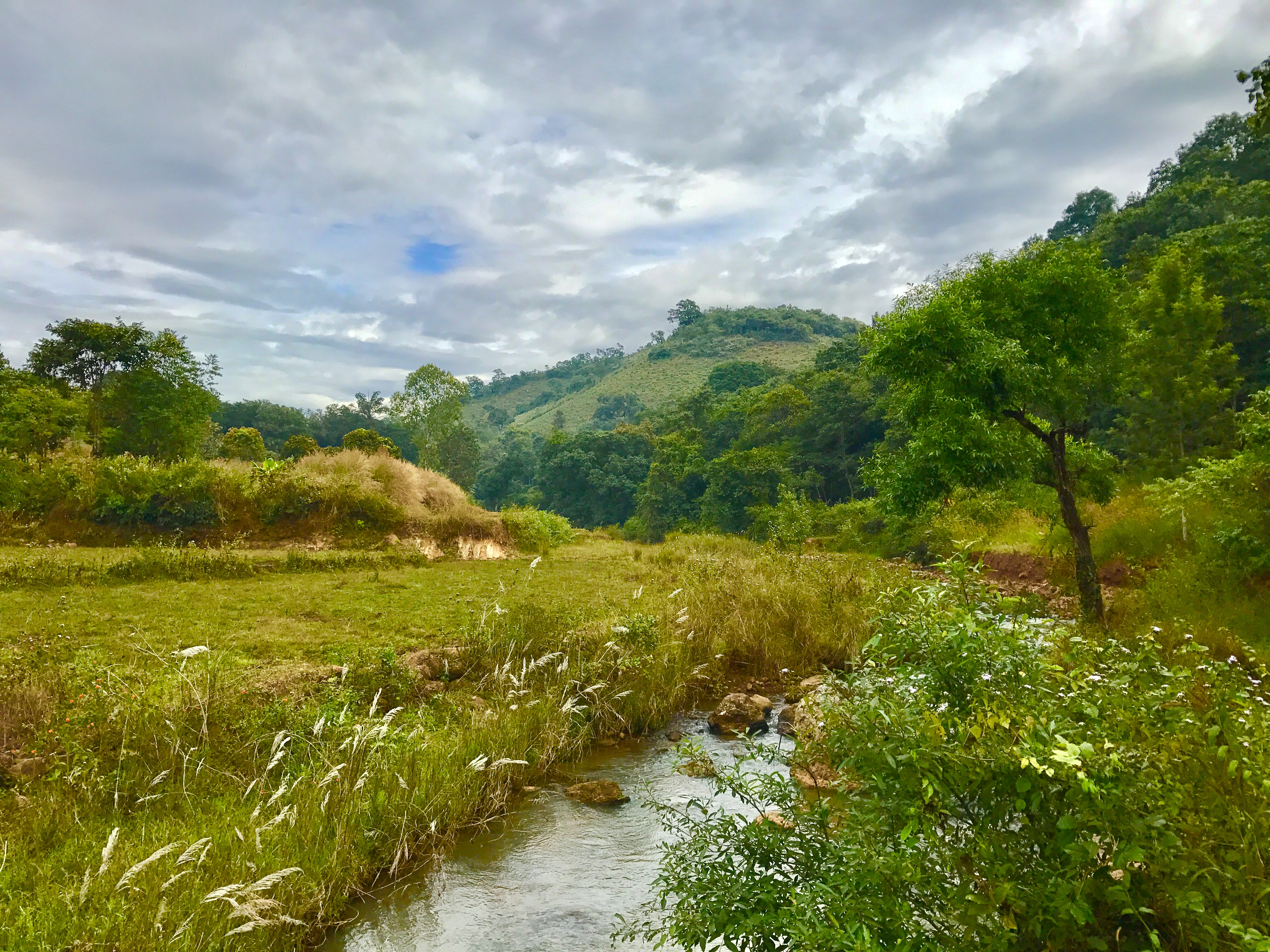
Lambasingi hill station

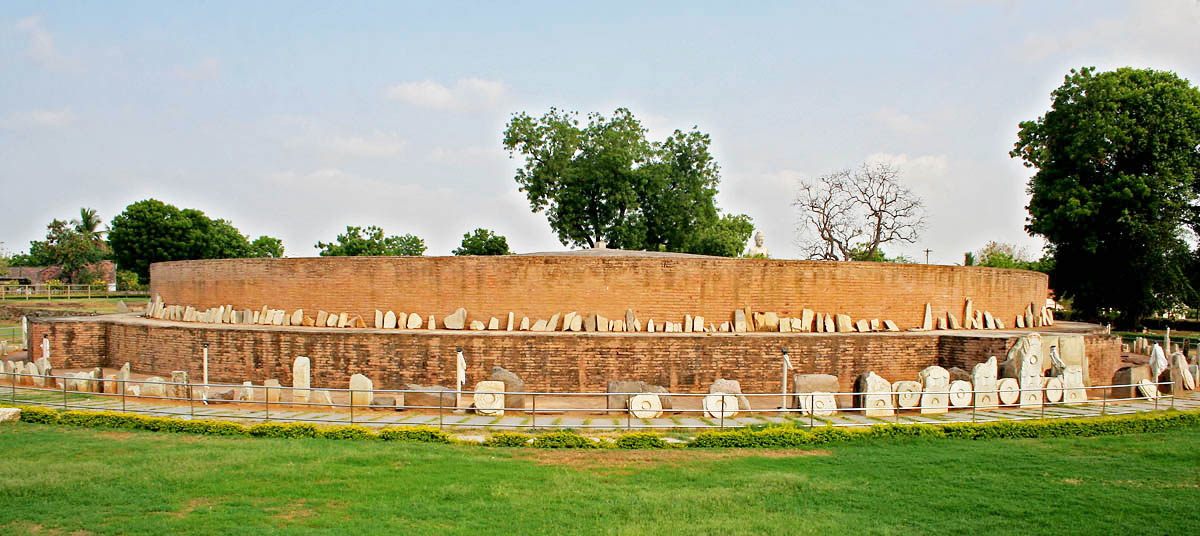
Amaravati Stupa, an important Buddhist site; its antiquity dates to about 500 BCE

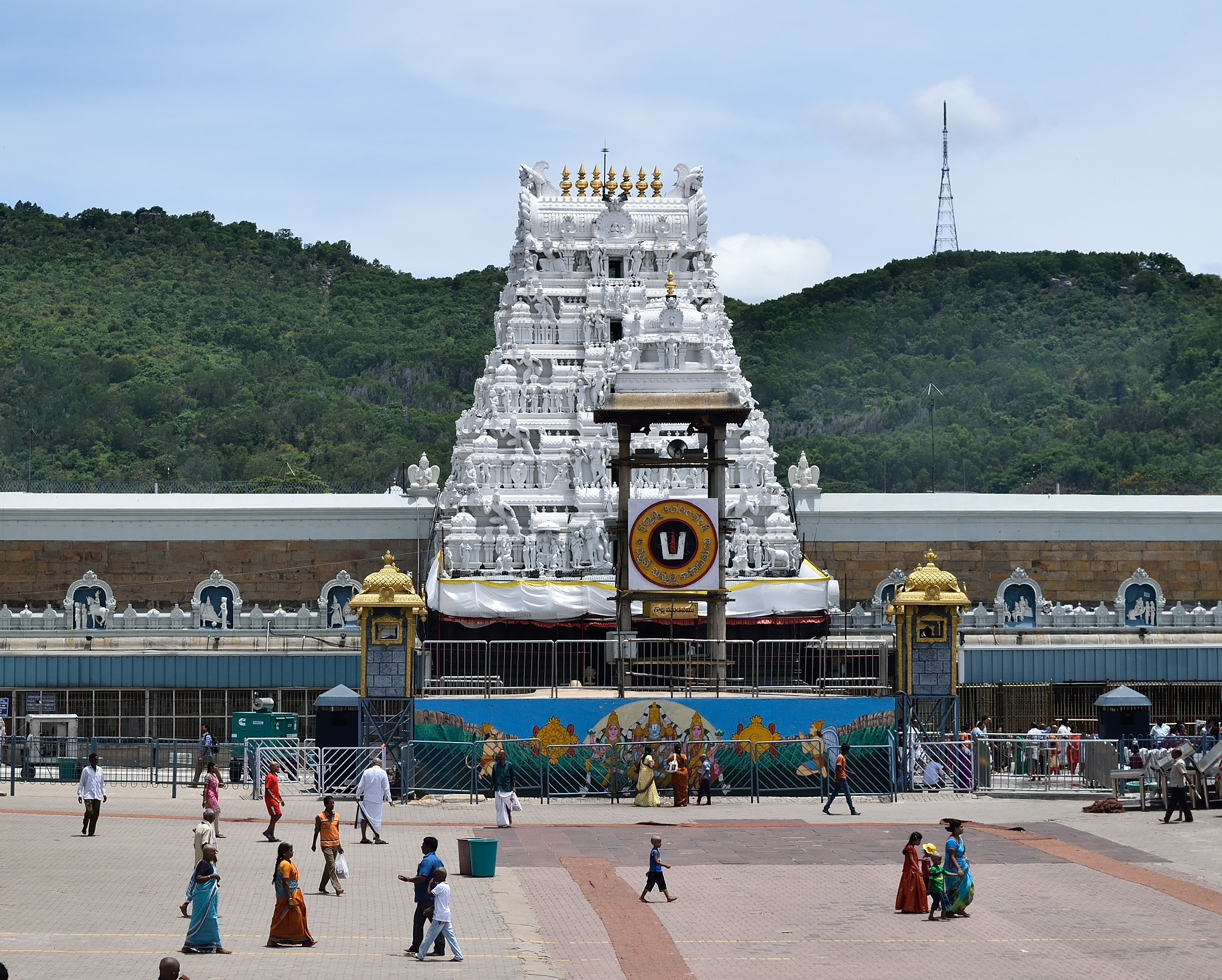
Tirumala Venkateswara Temple

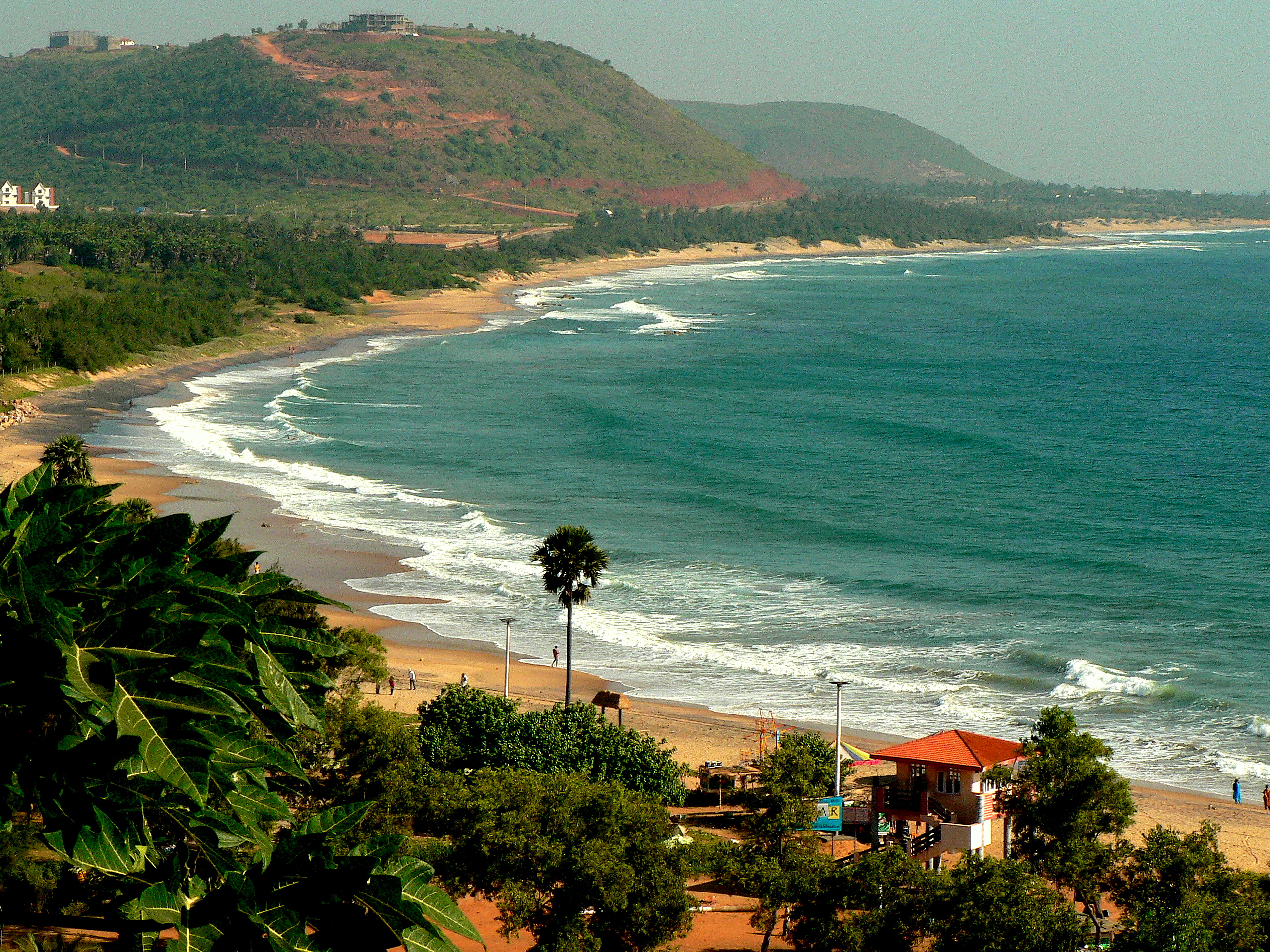
Rushikonda Beach, Visakhapatnam

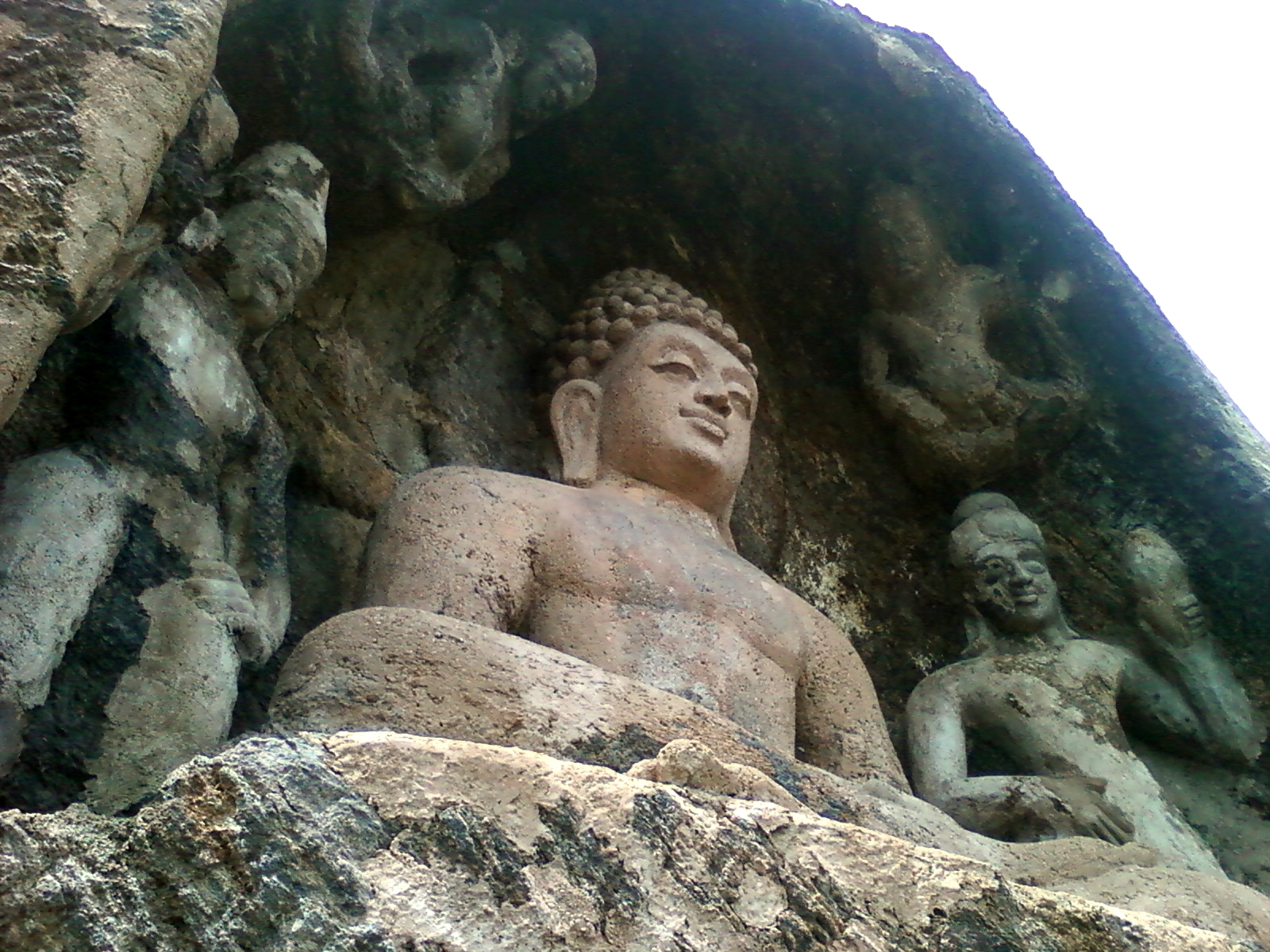
Rock-cut Buddha at Bojjanakonda, Visakhapatnam district

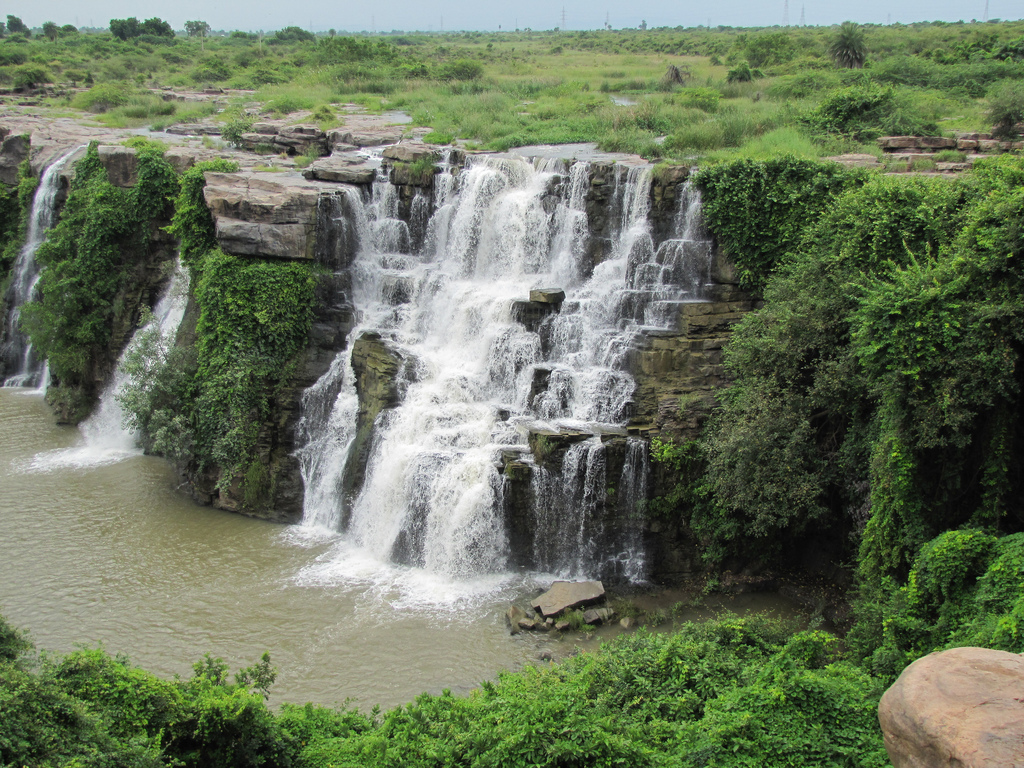
Ethipothala Waterfalls

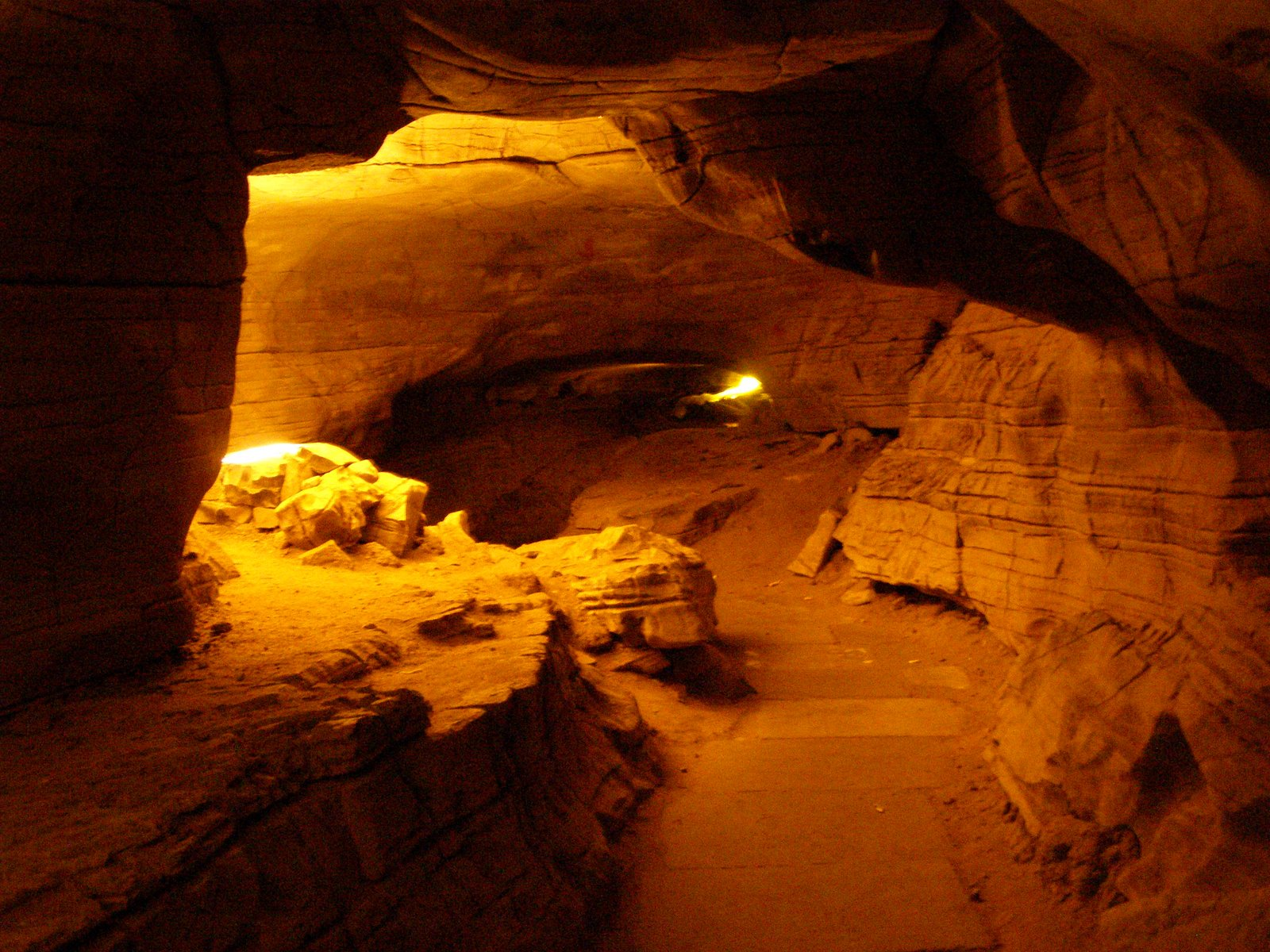
Belum Caves, Kurnool district

Tourism features numerous Hindu and Buddhist pilgrimage destinations, along with beaches, caves, hill stations, and wildlife sites.

=== Pilgrimage sites ===
- Venkateswara Temple – Located in the hills near Tirumala, this temple is a major Vaishnavite pilgrimage centre dedicated to Venkateswara.
- Kanaka Durga Temple – A temple dedicated to Goddess Durga on Indrakeeladri Hill in Vijayawada on the Krishna River. Major festivals include Dussehra and Theppotsavam.
- Mallikarjuna Temple – Located at Srisailam in the Nallamala Hills, it is one of the twelve Jyotirlinga shrines dedicated to Shiva.
- Kodandarama Temple – A 16th-century temple at Vontimitta, Kadapa district, dedicated to Rama.
- Pancharama Kshetras – Five ancient Shiva temples: Amararama (Amaravathi), Draksharama, Somarama (Bhimavaram), Ksheerarama (Palakollu), and Kumararama (Samalkota).
- Srikalahasteeswara Temple – Located in Srikalahasti, Chittoor district, it is associated with the Panchabhoota manifestation of Vayu (air).
- Shakta pithas – Important shrines at Draksharamam, Pithapuram, and Srisailam.

=== Buddhist centres ===
- Amaravathi – Guntur district
- Nagarjunakonda – Guntur district
- Bhattiprolu – Guntur district
- Ghantasala – Krishna district
- Sankaram – Visakhapatnam district
- Bavikonda – Visakhapatnam district
- Thotlakonda – Visakhapatnam district
- Ramatheertham – Vizianagaram district
- Salihundam – Srikakulam district
- Lingapalem – West Godavari district

Other Buddhist sites include Pavurallakonda, Chandavaram, Guntupalli, Adurru, Kummarilova, Kotturu Dhanadibbalu, Karukonda, Kapavaram, and Nandalu.

=== Places of interest ===
- Araku Valley – A hill station near Visakhapatnam known for its coffee plantations.
- Undavalli Caves – A multi-storey monolithic cave complex, largely dating to the early centuries CE.
- Gandikota Fort – Situated on the Penna River, it includes the Madhavaraya and Ranganatha temples.
- Thimmamma Marrimanu – A sprawling banyan tree noted for its extensive canopy.
- Prakasam Barrage – A road-cum-rail bridge across the Krishna River at Vijayawada.
- Kolleru Lake – A large freshwater lake situated between Krishna and West Godavari districts.
- Pulicat Lake – A brackish lagoon on the Andhra Pradesh–Tamil Nadu border along the Bay of Bengal, much of which forms the Pulicat Lake Bird Sanctuary.
- Uppalapadu Bird Sanctuary – A bird sanctuary near Guntur that attracts thousands of migratory birds each season.
- Ethipothala Falls – A waterfall on the Chandravanka stream near Nagarjuna Sagar Dam.
- Borra Caves – A cave system in the Ananthagiri Hills of the Eastern Ghats near Visakhapatnam, renowned for its stalactite and stalagmite formations.
- Belum Caves – A cave system in Kurnool district featuring long passages, large chambers, and freshwater galleries.
- Indira Gandhi Zoological Park – A zoological park located within the reserve forests of Visakhapatnam district.
- Sri Venkateswara National Park – A national park in the Tirumala Hills of Chittoor district, containing waterfalls including Talakona.
- Horsley Hills – A hill station near Madanapalle in Chittoor district.
- Suryalanka Beach – A seaside resort near Bapatla in Guntur district.
- Rajahmundry – A city on the Godavari River known for landmarks including the Godavari Bridge, ISKCON Temple, and Pushkar ghats.
- Visakhapatnam – A major coastal city with attractions including the INS Kurusura Submarine Museum, Yarada Beach, and VUDA Park.

== Arunachal Pradesh ==
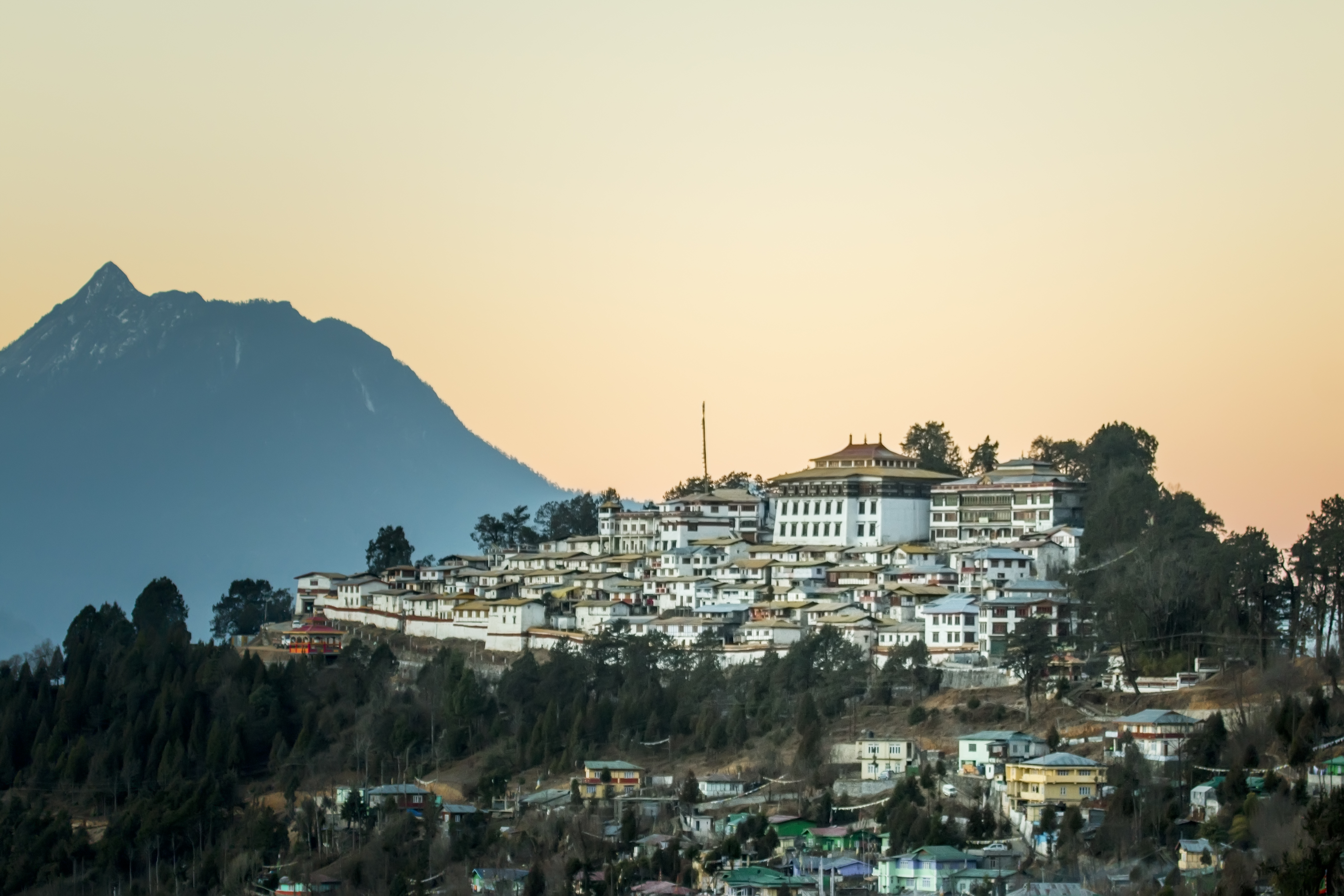
Tawang Monastery in Arunachal Pradesh

According to Puranic and epic traditions, the region is associated with episodes in the Kalika Purana and the Mahabharata, including sites linked to Parashurama, Vyasa, Bhishmaka, and Krishna and Rukmini; these associations are matters of legend and require citations.

Places of worship and pilgrimage include Parashurama Kund and the 17th‑century Tawang Monastery. Tawang Monastery is the largest monastery in India and the second-largest in the world. Archaeological and heritage sites include Malinithan and Ita Fort in Itanagar. Lakes include Ganga Lake (Geker Sinying) near Itanagar and lakes around Sela Pass. The state offers opportunities for angling, boating, rafting, trekking, and hiking, and has multiple wildlife sanctuaries and national parks.

== Assam ==
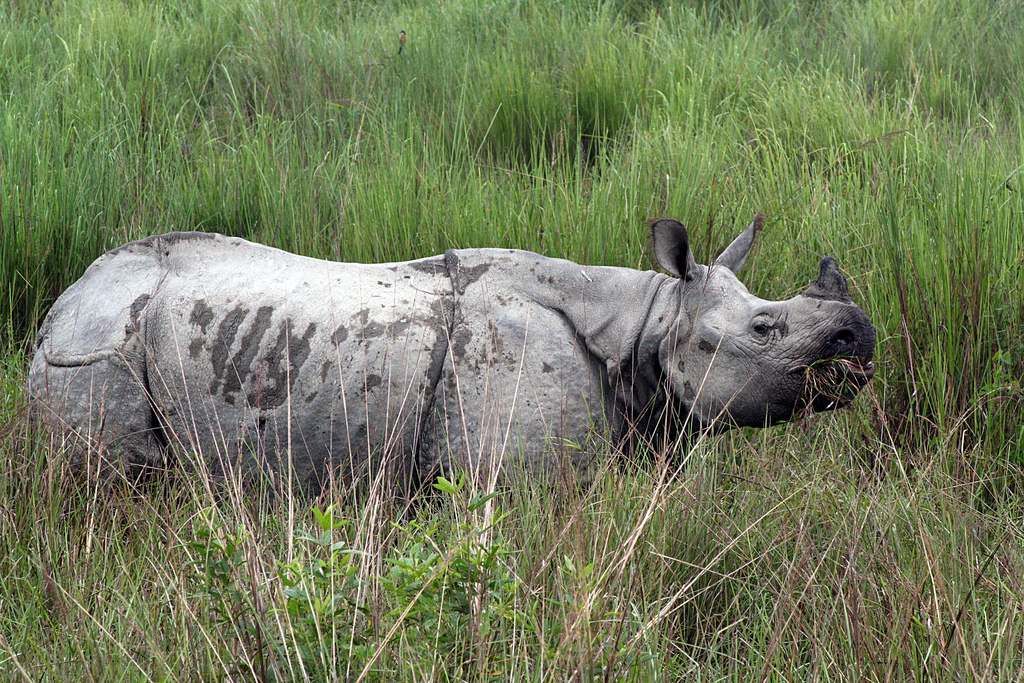
An Indian rhinoceros in Kaziranga National Park, a UNESCO World Heritage Site

Assam is a state in Northeast India and serves as a gateway to the other Seven Sister States. It has several protected areas, including Kaziranga National Park, home to the one-horned rhinoceros, Manas National Park, Dibru-Saikhowa National Park, Nameri National Park, and Pobitora Wildlife Sanctuary; Kaziranga and Manas are UNESCO World Heritage Sites. The state also includes the large river island Majuli, known for its Vaishnavite Sattras, historic Sivasagar with monuments of the Ahom kingdom, the city of Tezpur, and tea estates and rubber plantations dating to the British Raj.

Other sites include Madan Kamdev, a temple complex noted for sculptural remains about 30 km from Guwahati; nearby is Gopeswar Mandir at Deuduar. Basudev Than is a satra more than 300 years old.

Assam's cultural heritage includes the period of the Ahom kingdom, which governed the region for centuries before British rule. Notable features include the Brahmaputra River, the bird-death phenomenon reported at Jatinga, and temples such as the Kamakhya Temple, associated with Tantra. Gurdwara Sri Guru Tegh Bahadur (Damdama Sahib) is located in Dhubri on the Brahmaputra. Guwahati, the state's largest city, features markets, temples, and nearby wildlife sanctuaries.

== Bihar ==
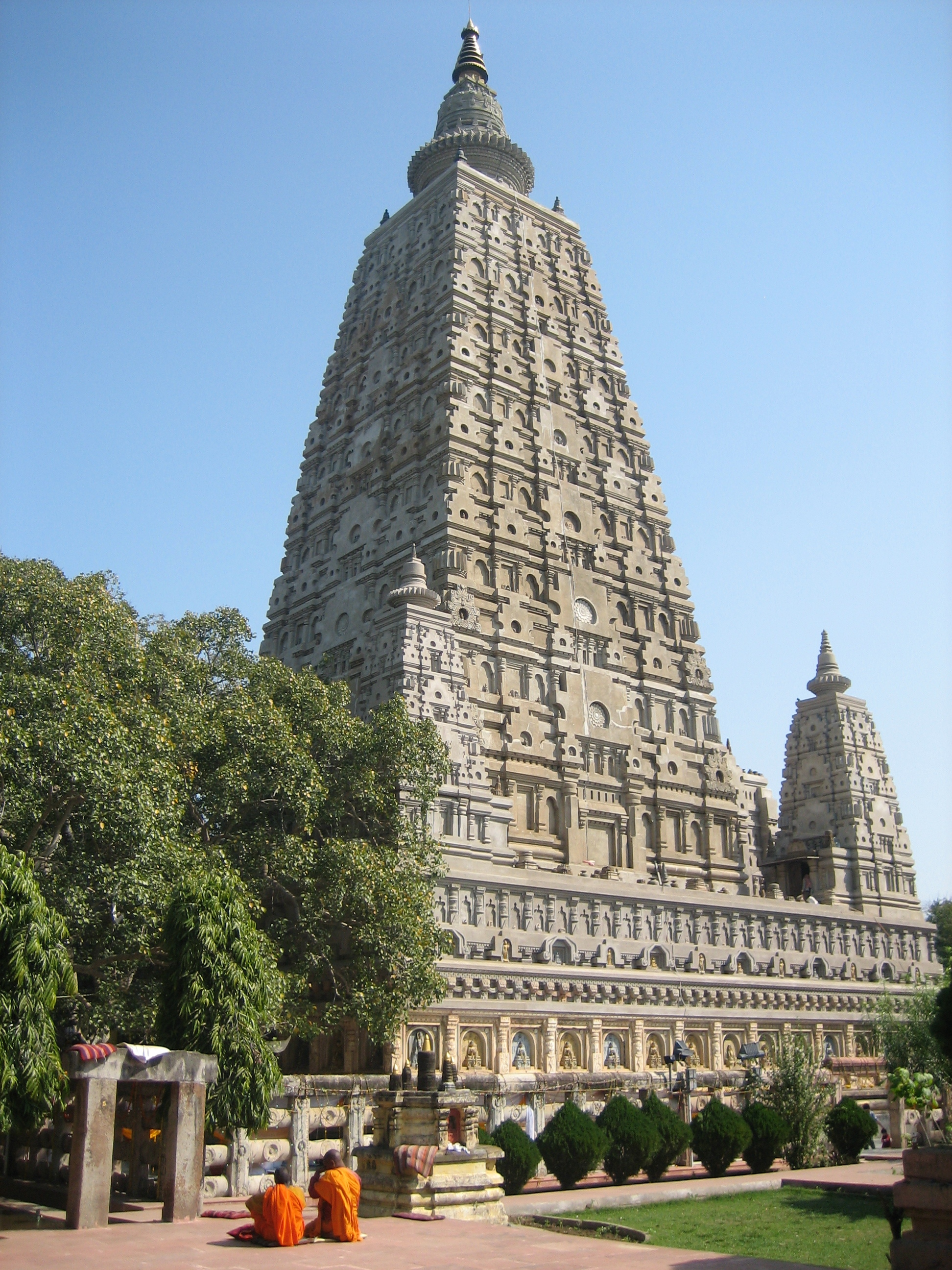
The Mahabodhi Temple, a UNESCO World Heritage Site

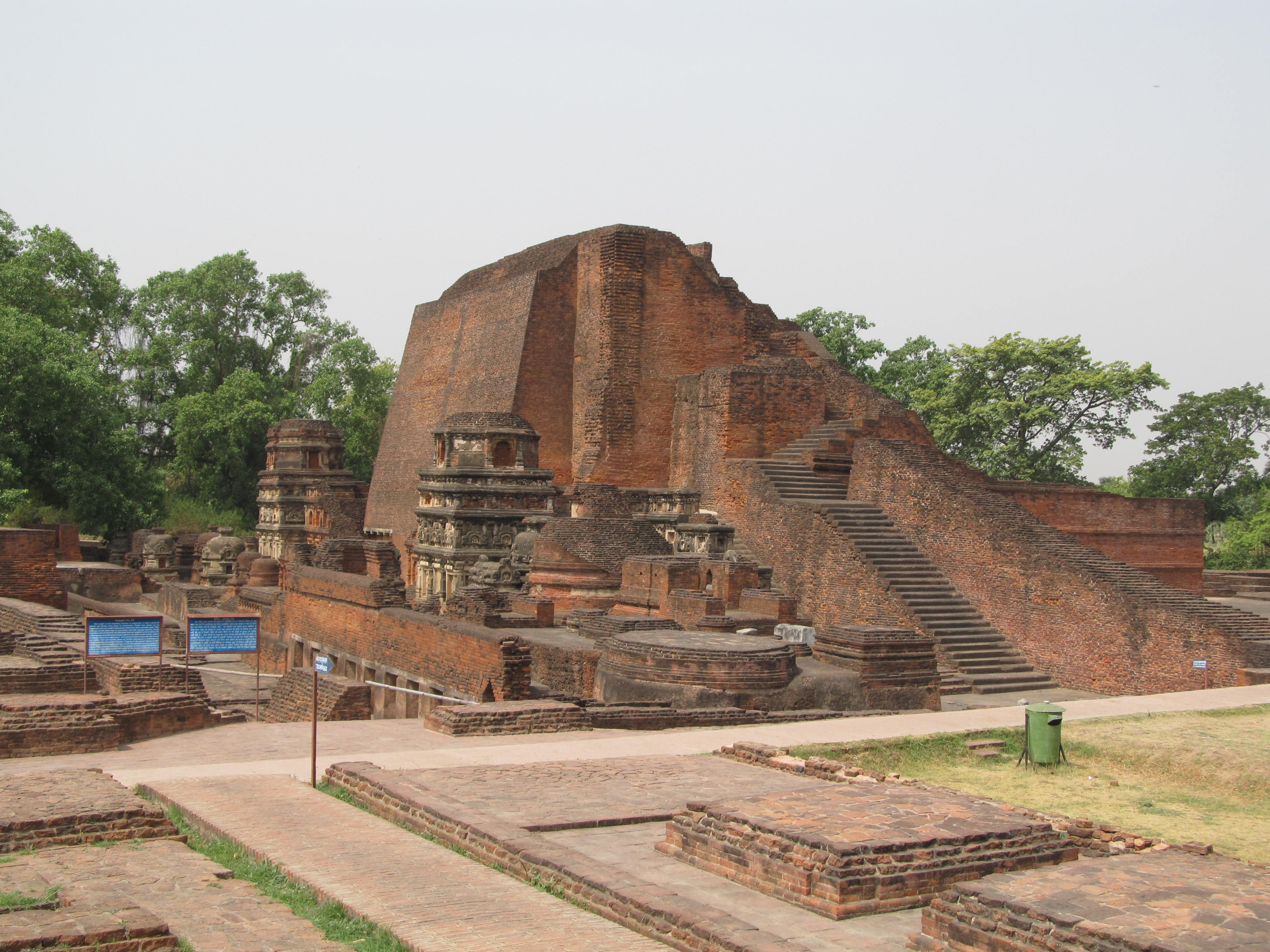
Ruins of Nalanda, a UNESCO World Heritage Site since 2016

Bihar is among the world's oldest continuously inhabited regions, with human settlement dating back over 3,000 years. It is associated with figures such as Gautama Buddha, Mahavira, Ashoka, Chandragupta Maurya, and Aryabhata.

In 2024, Bihar recorded 65 million domestic and 700,000 foreign tourist arrivals.

Attractions

- Patna – The state capital, known for its historical sites and riverfront.
- Gaya – The site of Bodh Gaya, where Gautama Buddha attained enlightenment under the Bodhi Tree at the Mahabodhi Temple; also the location of the Vishnupad Temple and the Mangla Gauri Temple.
- Muzaffarpur – Known for lychee cultivation and local temples.
- Darbhanga – Historic city with palaces and the Kali Mandir.
- Nalanda – Site of the ancient Nalanda University.
- Kesariya – Location of the Kesariya Stupa, one of the largest Buddhist stupas.
- Sasaram – Contains the tomb of Sher Shah Suri.
- Sonepur Cattle Fair – Asia's largest cattle fair, held annually in Sonepur.
- Takht Sri Patna Sahib – A Sikh shrine at the birthplace of Guru Gobind Singh.
- Munger – Known for the Bihar School of Yoga and Shakta pithas.
- Vaishali – Birthplace of Mahavira.
- Champapuri – A Jain pilgrimage site associated with Tirthankara Vasupujya.
- Rajgir – An ancient city sacred to Buddhism and Jainism, near the Son Bhandar Caves.
- Pawapuri – Site of Mahavira's cremation and the Jal Mandir.

For further details, see List of tourist attractions in Bihar.

== Chandigarh ==
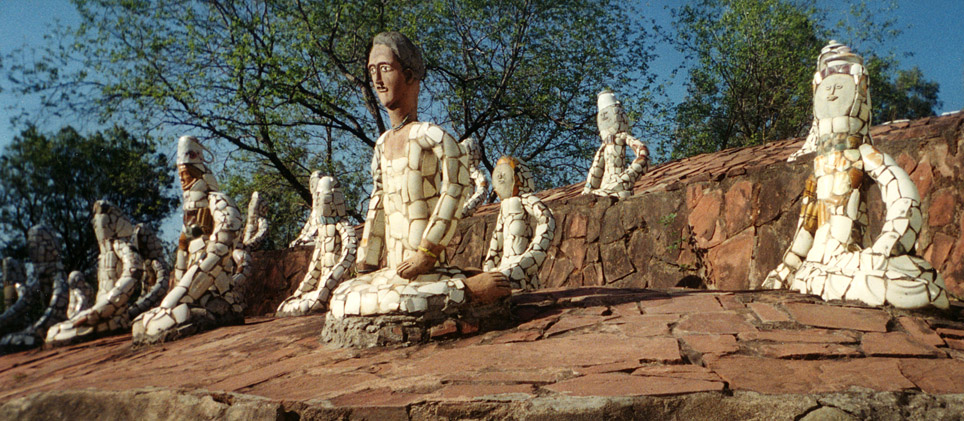
Rock Garden made of scrap material in Chandigarh

Chandigarh is a city and union territory at the foothills of the Himalayas and serves as the joint capital of Punjab and Haryana. Nicknamed the "City Beautiful," it is among India's earliest planned cities and was designed by Swiss‑French architect Le Corbusier. Major attractions include Nek Chand Rock Garden, Zakir Hussain Rose Garden, Sukhna Lake, the Open Hand Monument, and the Capitol Complex, the last of which is part of the World Heritage property "The Architectural Work of Le Corbusier." In 2025, Chandigarh was adjudged the second cleanest city in its population category in the Swachh Survekshan rankings by the Ministry of Housing and Urban Affairs.

== Chhattisgarh ==
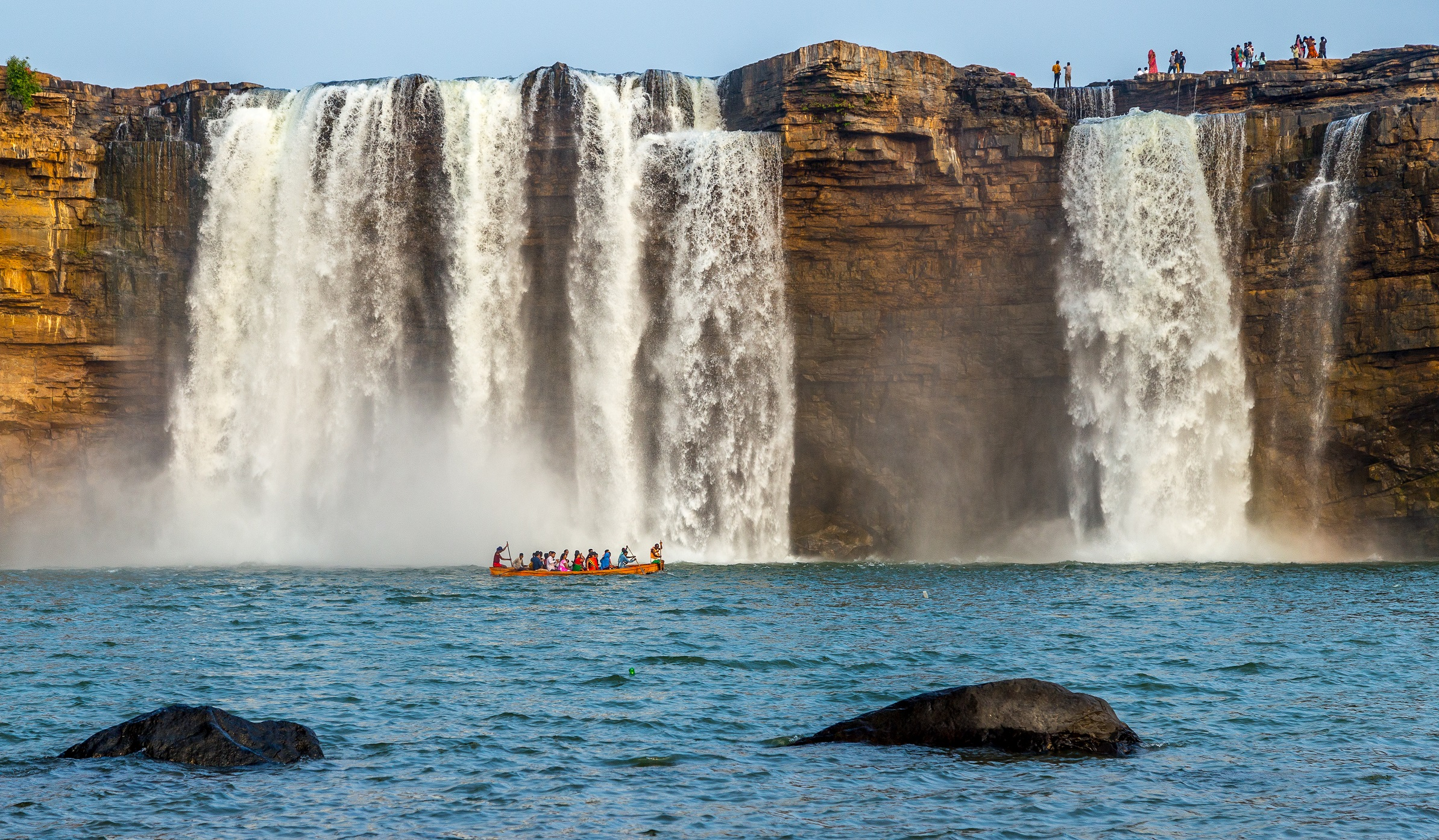
Chitrakote Falls in Chhattisgarh

Chhattisgarh became a state on 1 November 2000. According to the India State of Forest Report 2023, forests cover about 44.2% of the state's area; the report is published biennially by the Forest Survey of India under the Ministry of Environment, Forest and Climate Change. The state features ancient monuments, temples, Buddhist sites, waterfalls, caves, rock paintings, hill plateaus, and protected forests.

Prominent attractions include Chitrakote Falls on the Indravati River; Kotumsar Cave; the rock-cut caves at Ramgarh (Sitabenga and Jogimara); Bhoramdeo Temple; Arang temples; Sirpur; Rajim; Ratanpur; and Malhar.

== Delhi ==
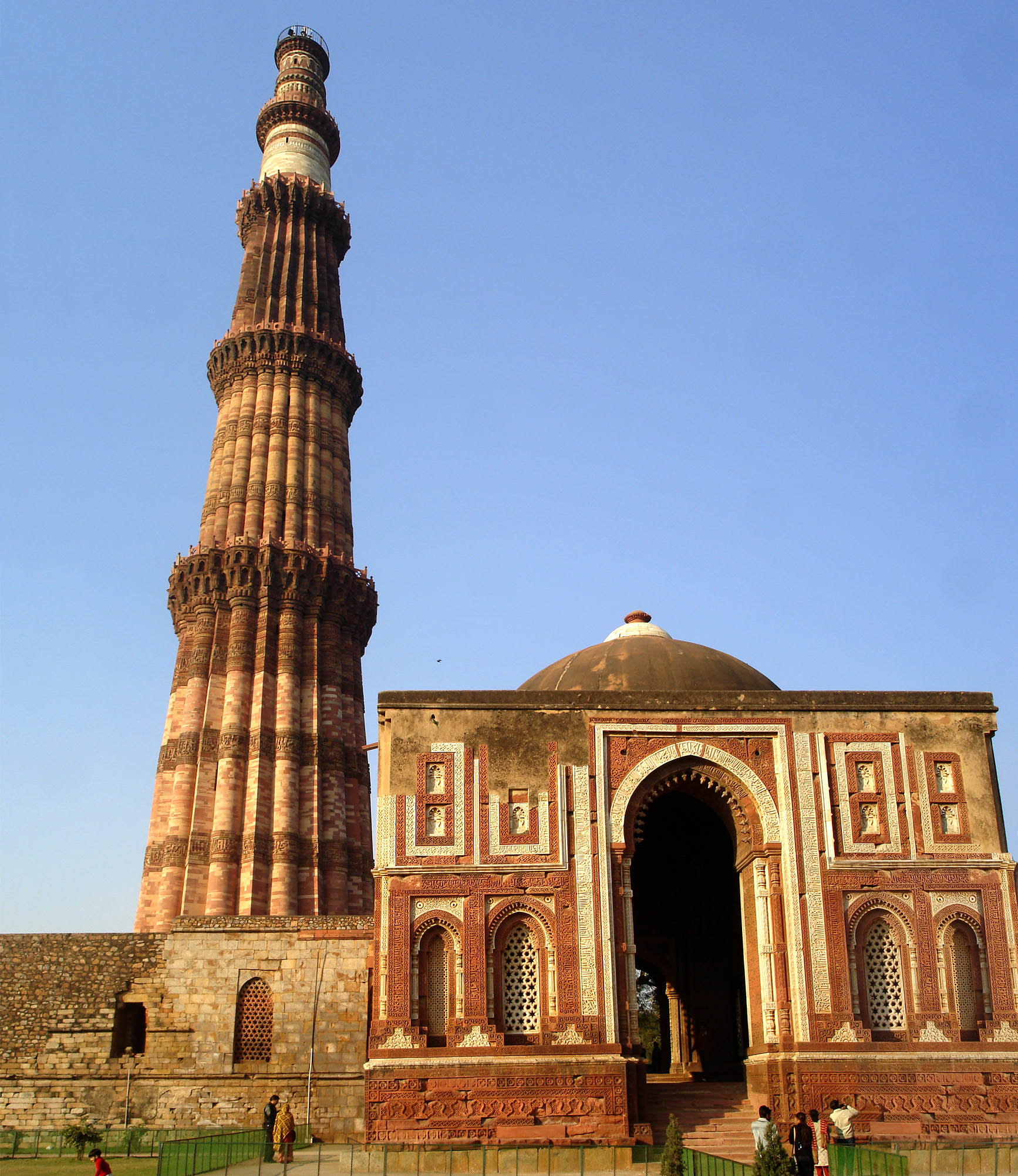
Qutb Minar in Delhi

Delhi is India's national capital and a union territory. Old Delhi has long served as a historic seat of power, while New Delhi was laid out in the early 20th century by architects Edwin Lutyens and Herbert Baker. New Delhi is noted for axial planning, broad boulevards, and monumental government buildings such as Rashtrapati Bhavan and the Parliament House.

Prominent landmarks include Qutb Minar, Red Fort, Jama Masjid, Humayun's Tomb, India Gate, and the Lotus Temple, alongside museums, parks, and markets across the city.

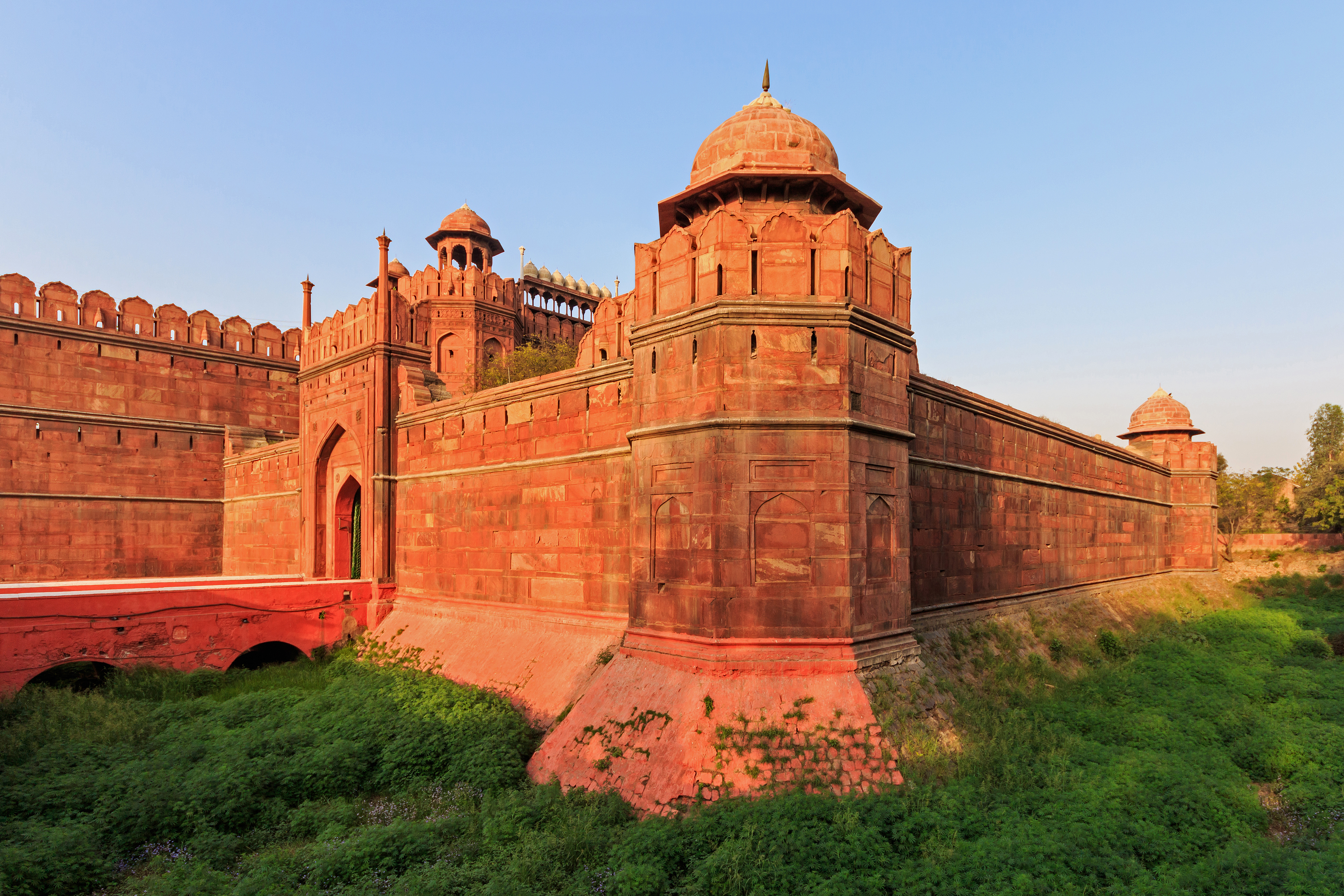
Red Fort

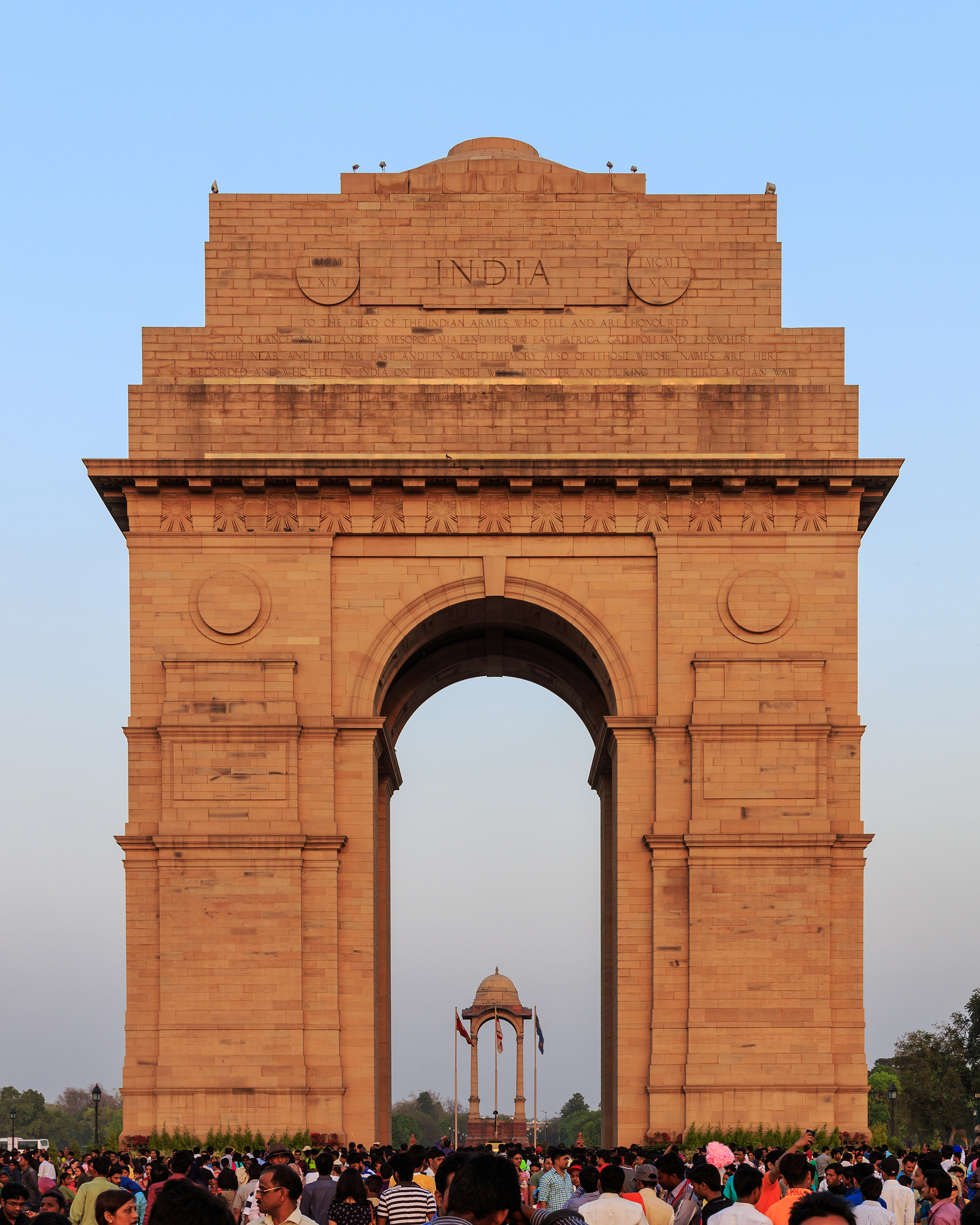
India Gate

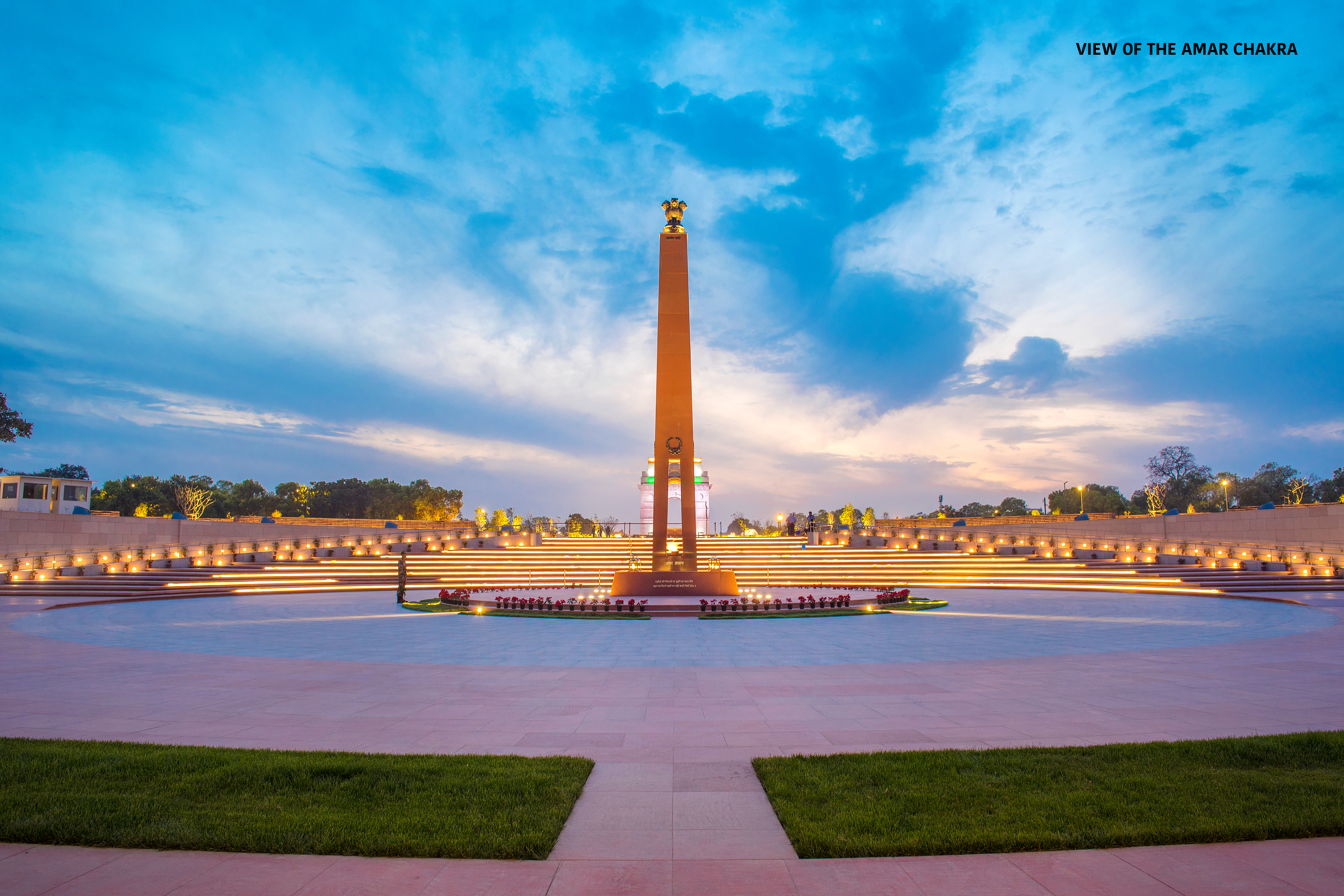
National War Memorial near India Gate

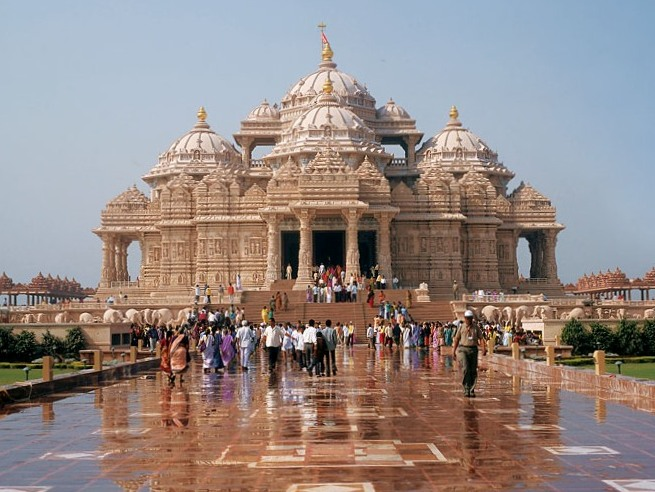
Akshardham Temple

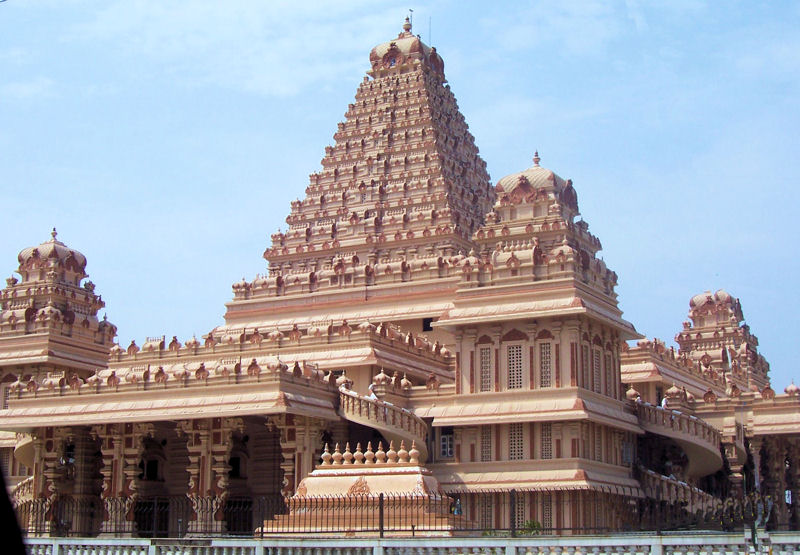
Chhatarpur Temple

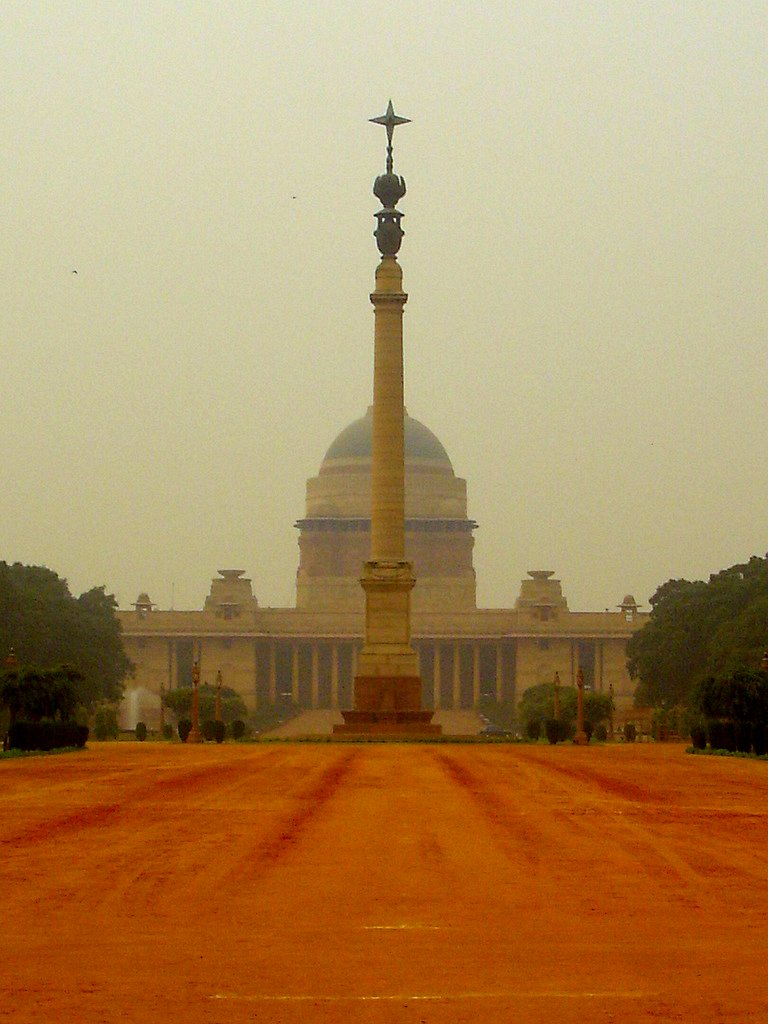
Rashtrapati Bhavan

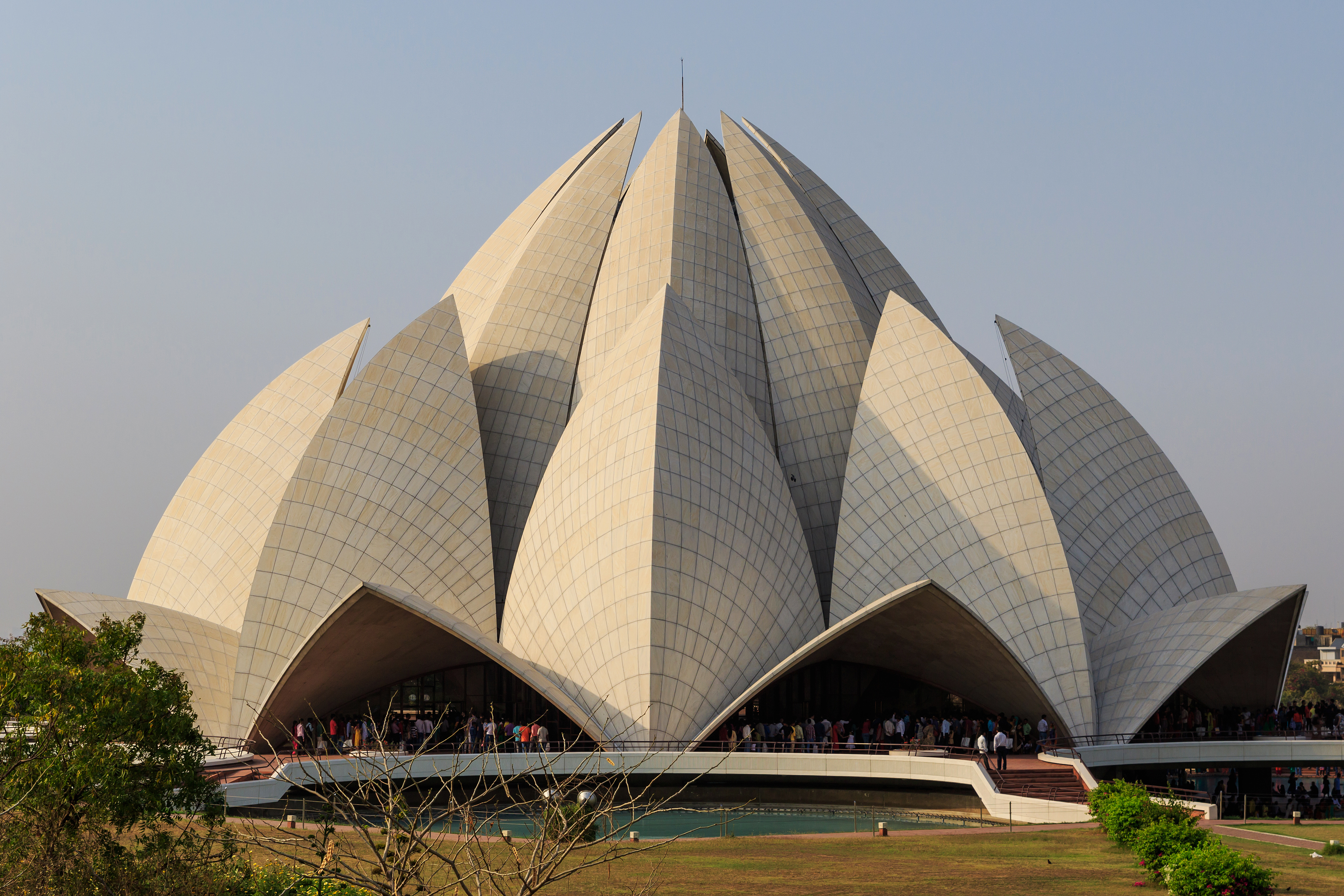
Lotus Temple

== Goa ==
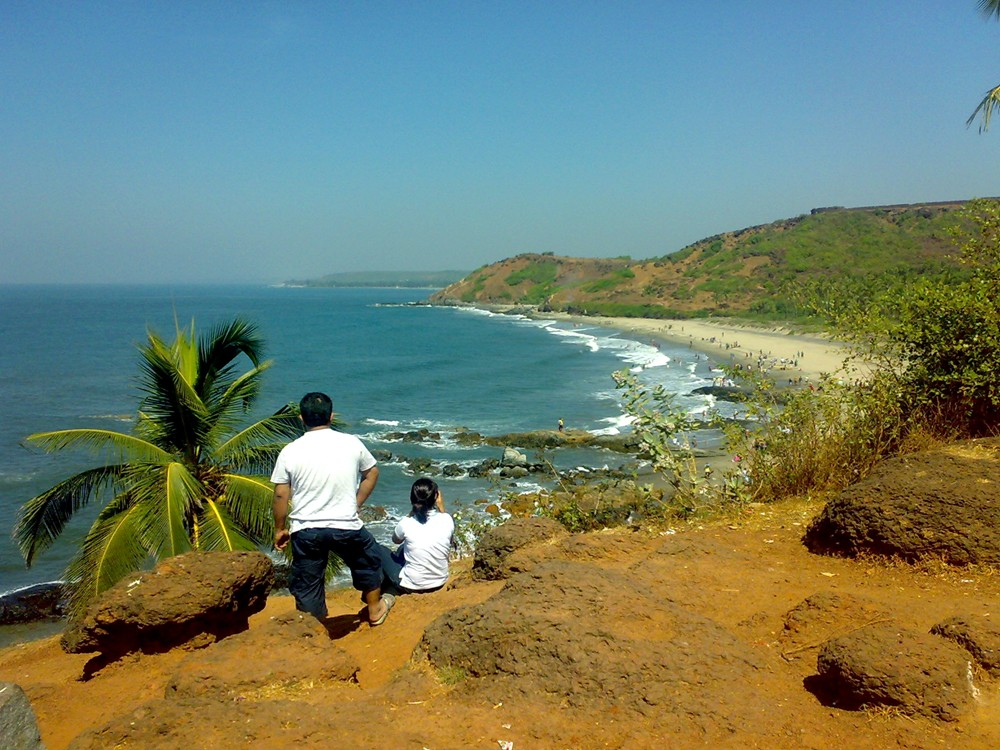
Vagator Beach seen from Chapora Fort

A former Portuguese colony, Goa is a coastal state known for its beaches, historic churches and temples, forts, waterfalls, wildlife sanctuaries, markets, and water-based recreation. The Churches and Convents of Goa in Old Goa—covering sites such as the Basilica of Bom Jesus and the Se Cathedral—are inscribed on the UNESCO World Heritage List. Other noted attractions include Shri Mangeshi Temple, Anjuna Beach, Fort Aguada, Chapora Fort, and Dudhsagar Falls.

The annual Goa Carnival is a pre‑Lenten festival featuring parades, floats, music, and dance held in towns including Panaji, Margao, Vasco, and Mapusa.

== Gujarat ==
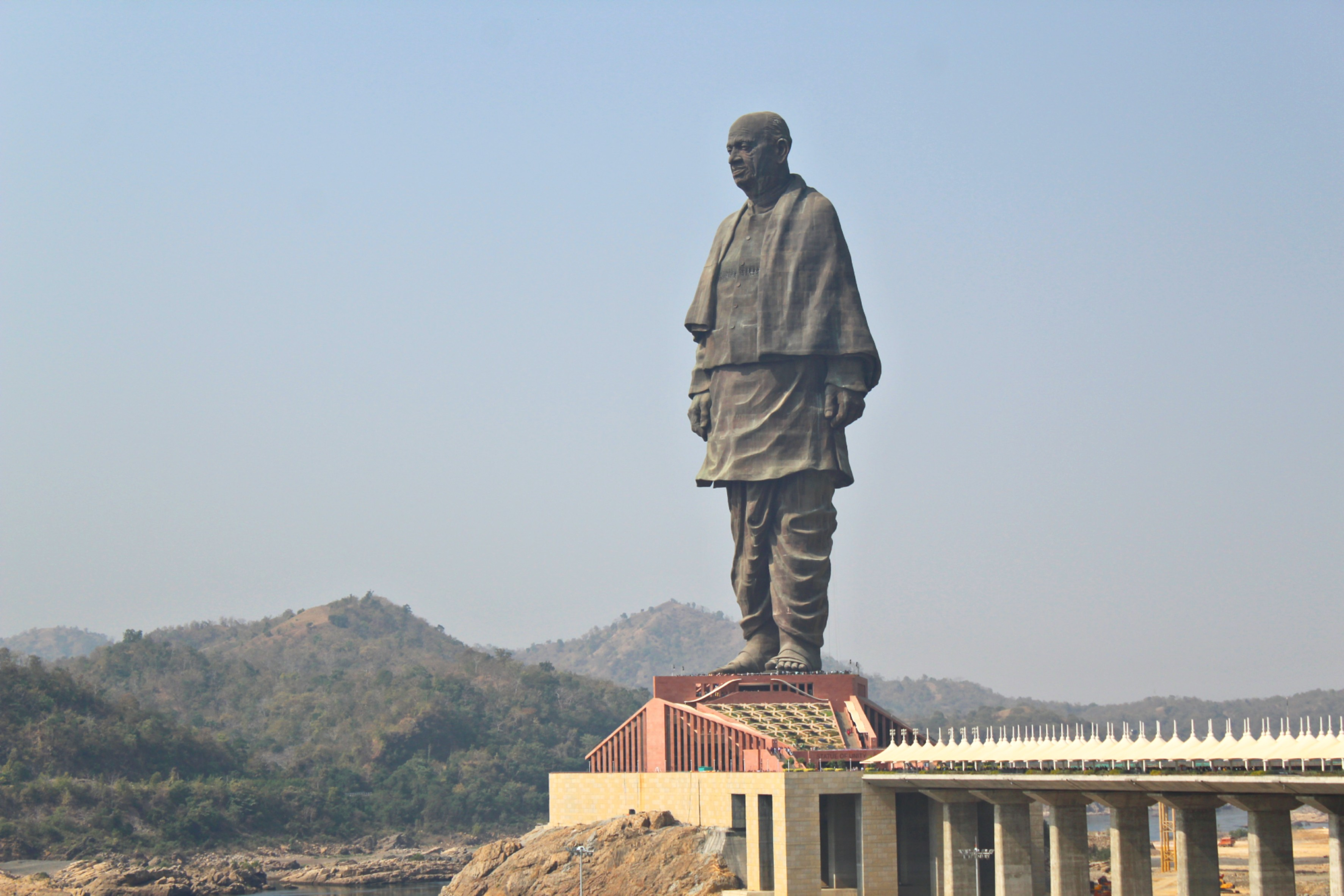
Statue of Unity, near Kevadia

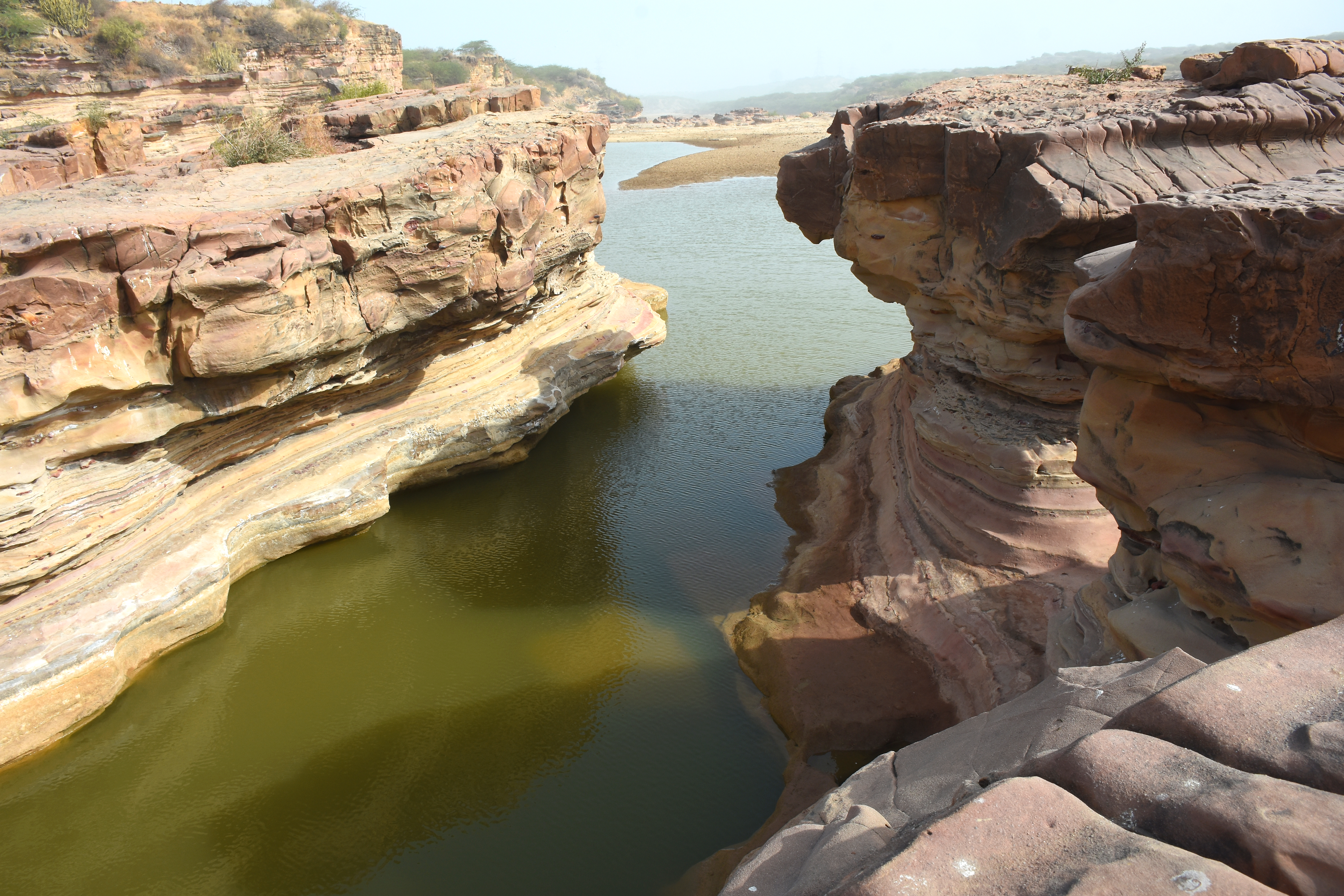
Kadiya Dhro in the Rann of Kutch, Gujarat

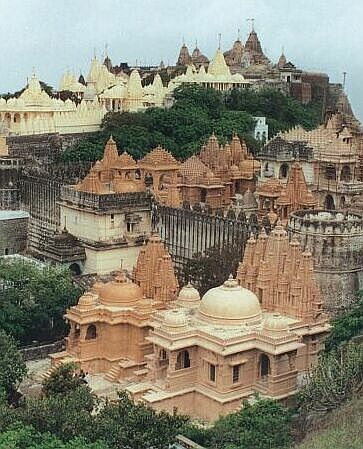
The Palitana temples on Shatrunjaya hills

Gujarat is a western Indian state on the Arabian Sea, noted for archaeological sites, historic temples and mosques, coastal landscapes, and wildlife reserves. Its inscribed World Heritage properties include Rani ki Vav (the Queen's Stepwell) at Patan, the Champaner-Pavagadh Archaeological Park, and Dholavira in Kachchh.

The last remaining wild population of the Asiatic lion occurs in and around Gir in Saurashtra, Gujarat. The Indus Valley site of Lothal in the Ahmedabad region is noted for an early dockyard and related maritime infrastructure.

Selected attractions - Rani ki Vav (Patan) — an 11th‑century stepwell inscribed on the UNESCO World Heritage List. - Champaner-Pavagadh Archaeological Park — a cultural landscape with fortifications, palaces, mosques, temples, and water systems spanning prehistoric to medieval periods. - Dholavira (Kachchh) — one of the best-preserved urban settlements of the Harappan civilisation, with sophisticated water management. - Gir Forest National Park — core area of the only wild Asiatic lion population. - Lothal — Harappan settlement with an early dockyard and archaeological museum.

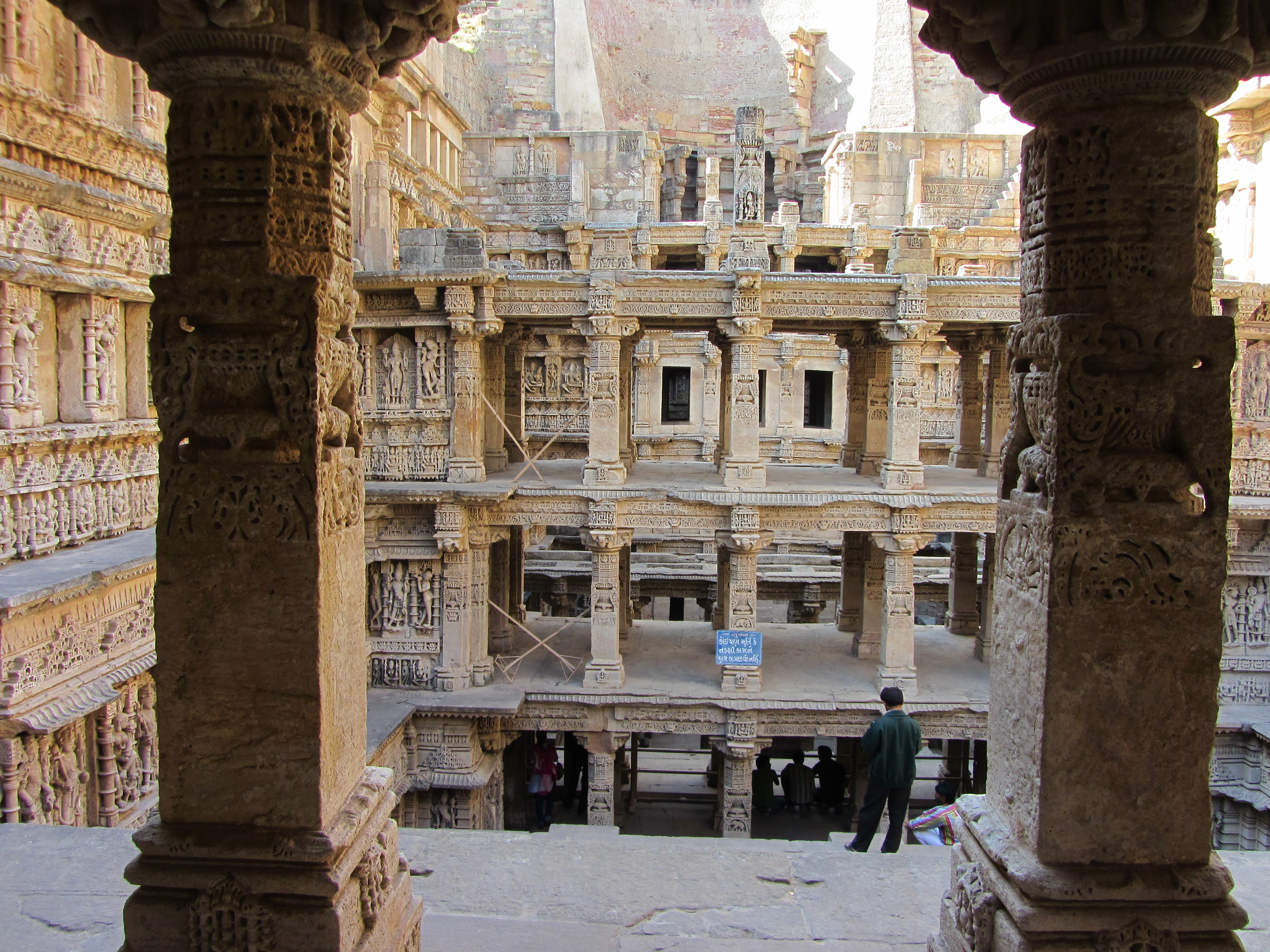
Rani ki Vav, a UNESCO World Heritage Site

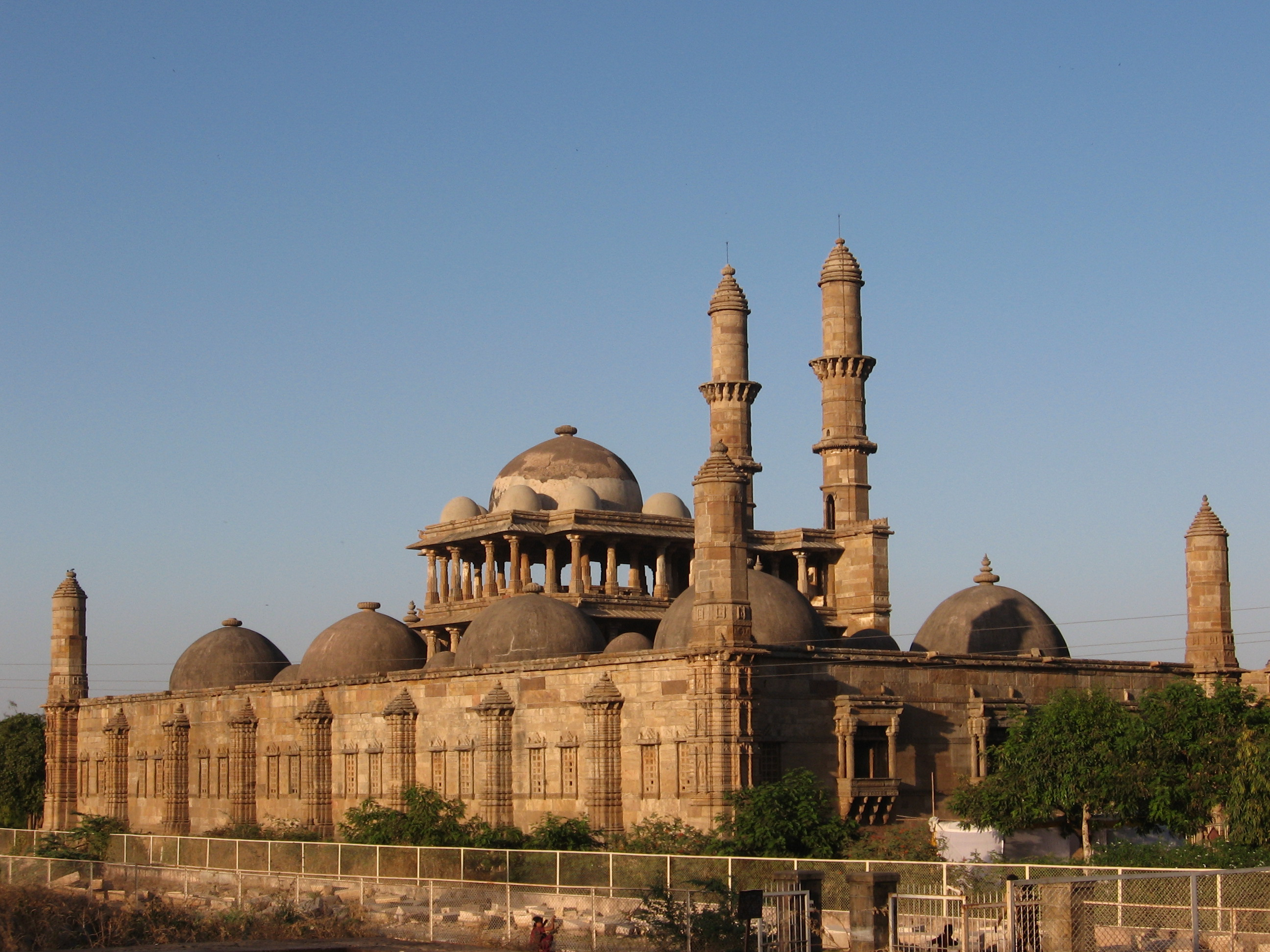
Jama Mosque, part of Champaner-Pavagadh Archaeological Park

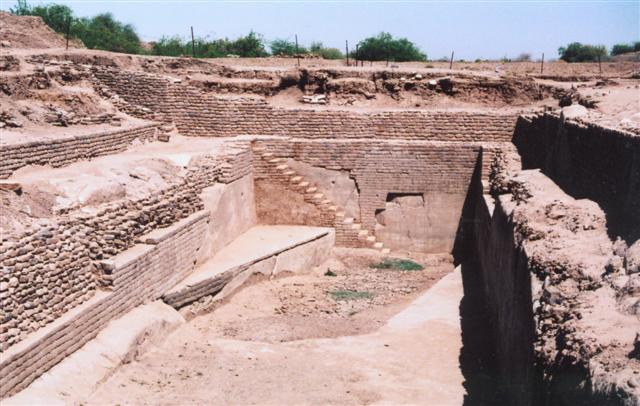
Dholavira, a major Indus Valley civilization city

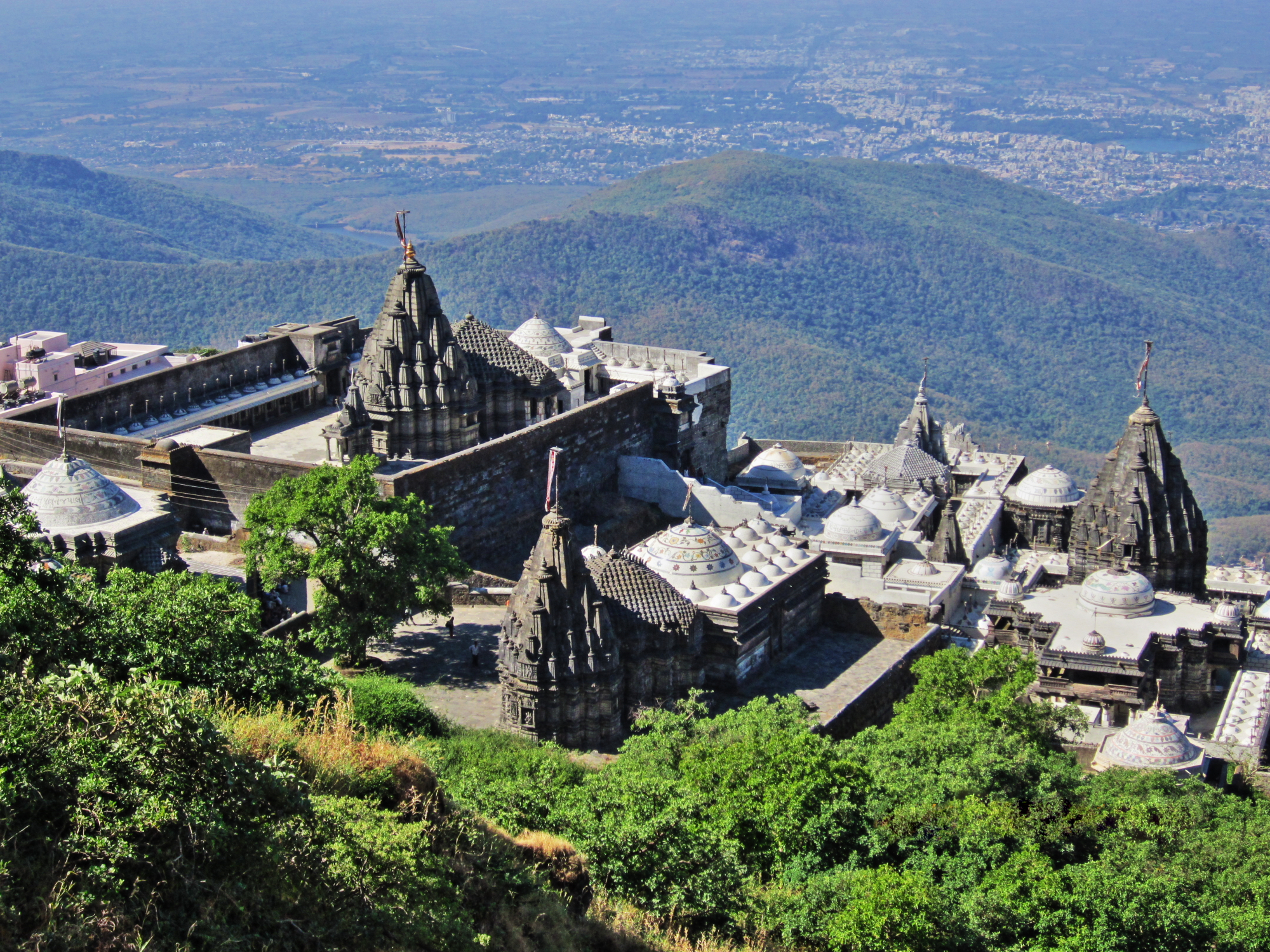
Girnar Jain temples near Junagadh

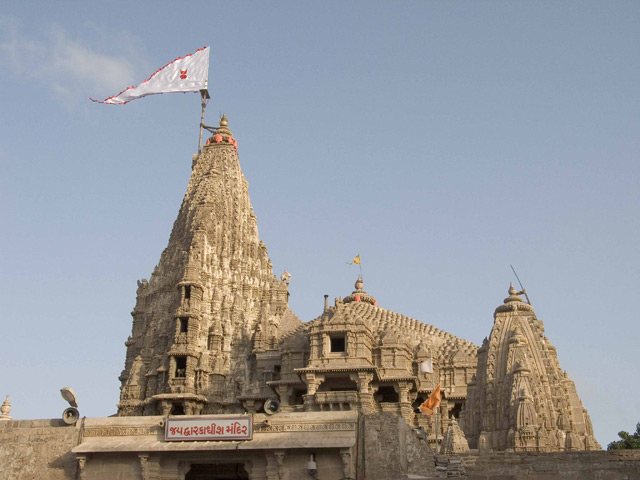
Dwarkadhish Temple in Dwarka

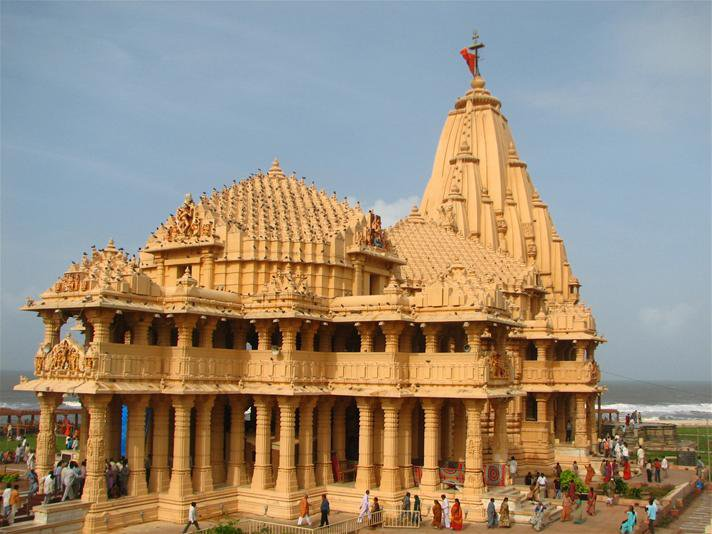
Somnath Temple in Gujarat

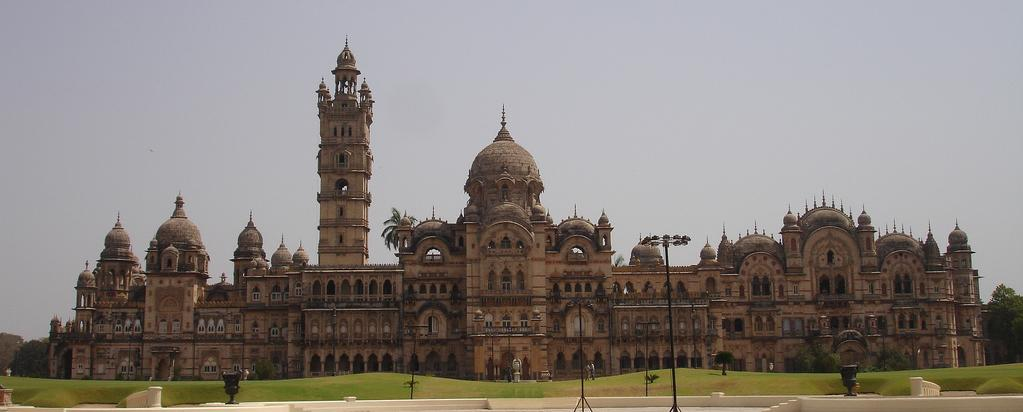
Laxmi Vilas Palace in Vadodara

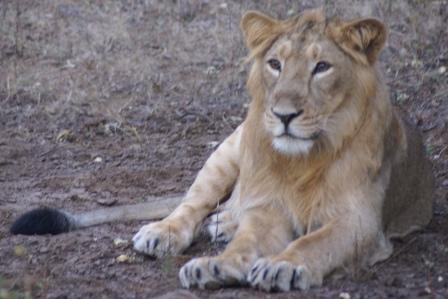
Asiatic lions occur in and around Gir Forest National Park

== Haryana ==
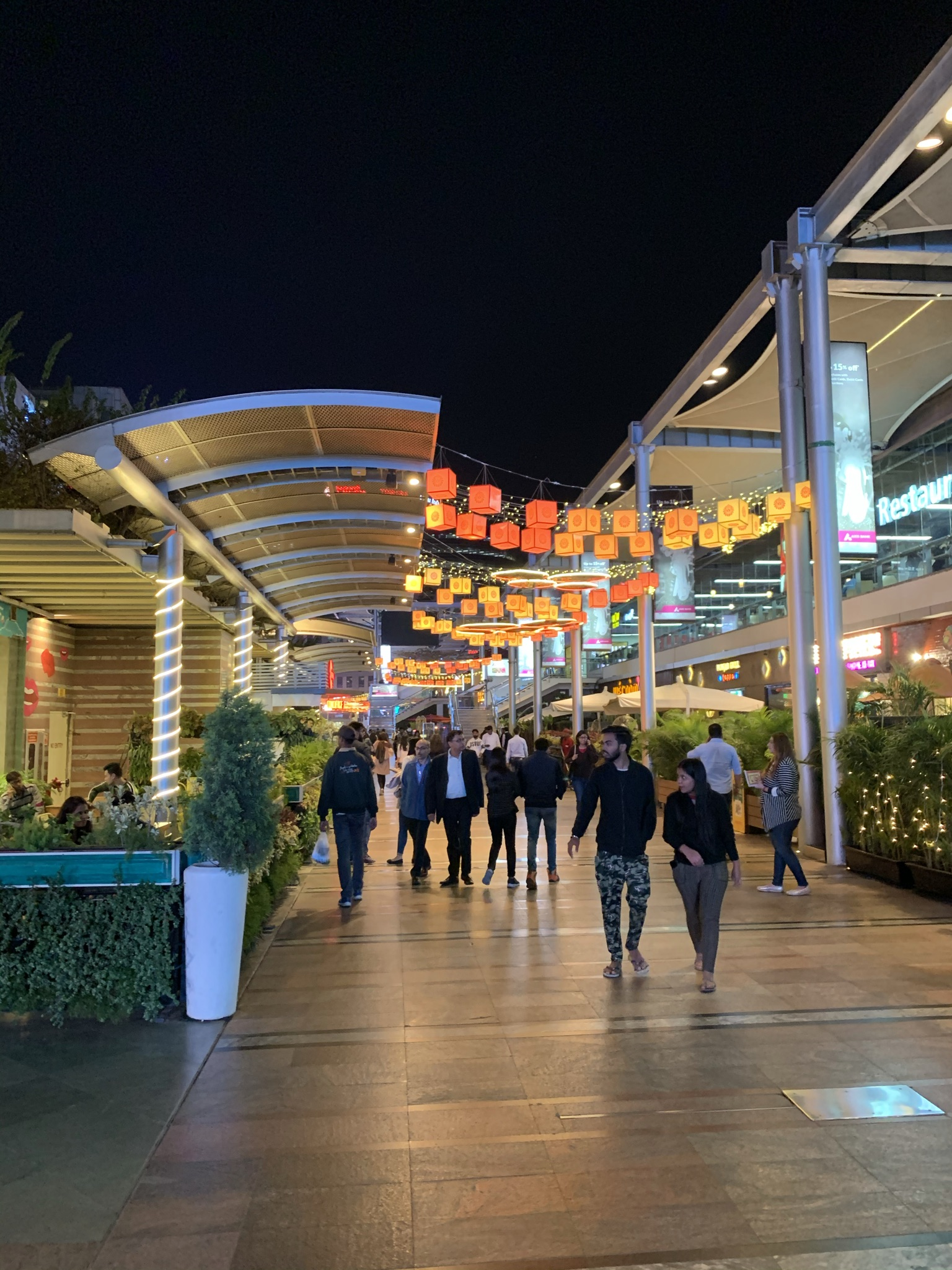
DLF CyberHub in Gurgaon (officially Gurugram)

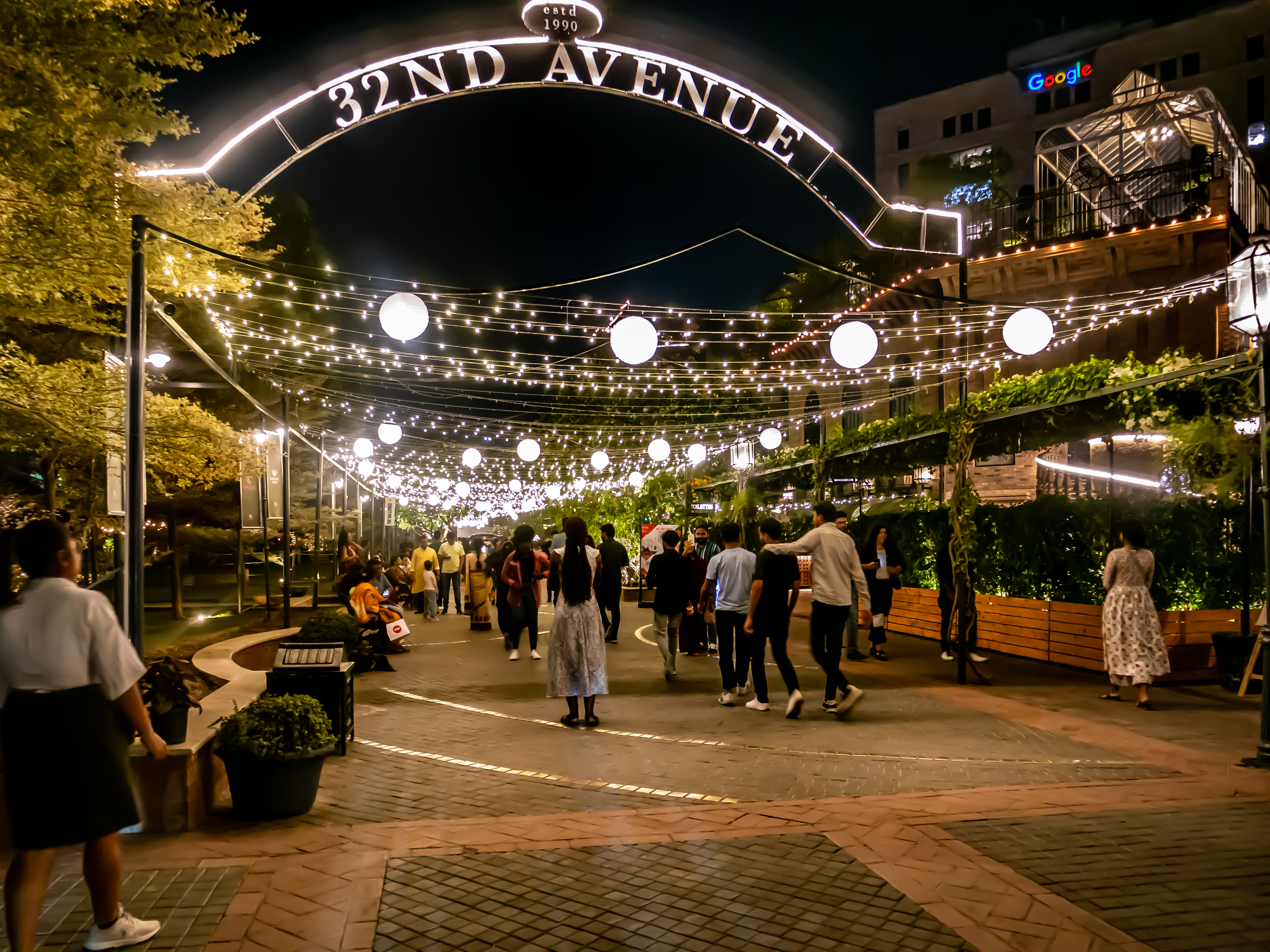
32nd Avenue in Gurgaon (officially Gurugram)

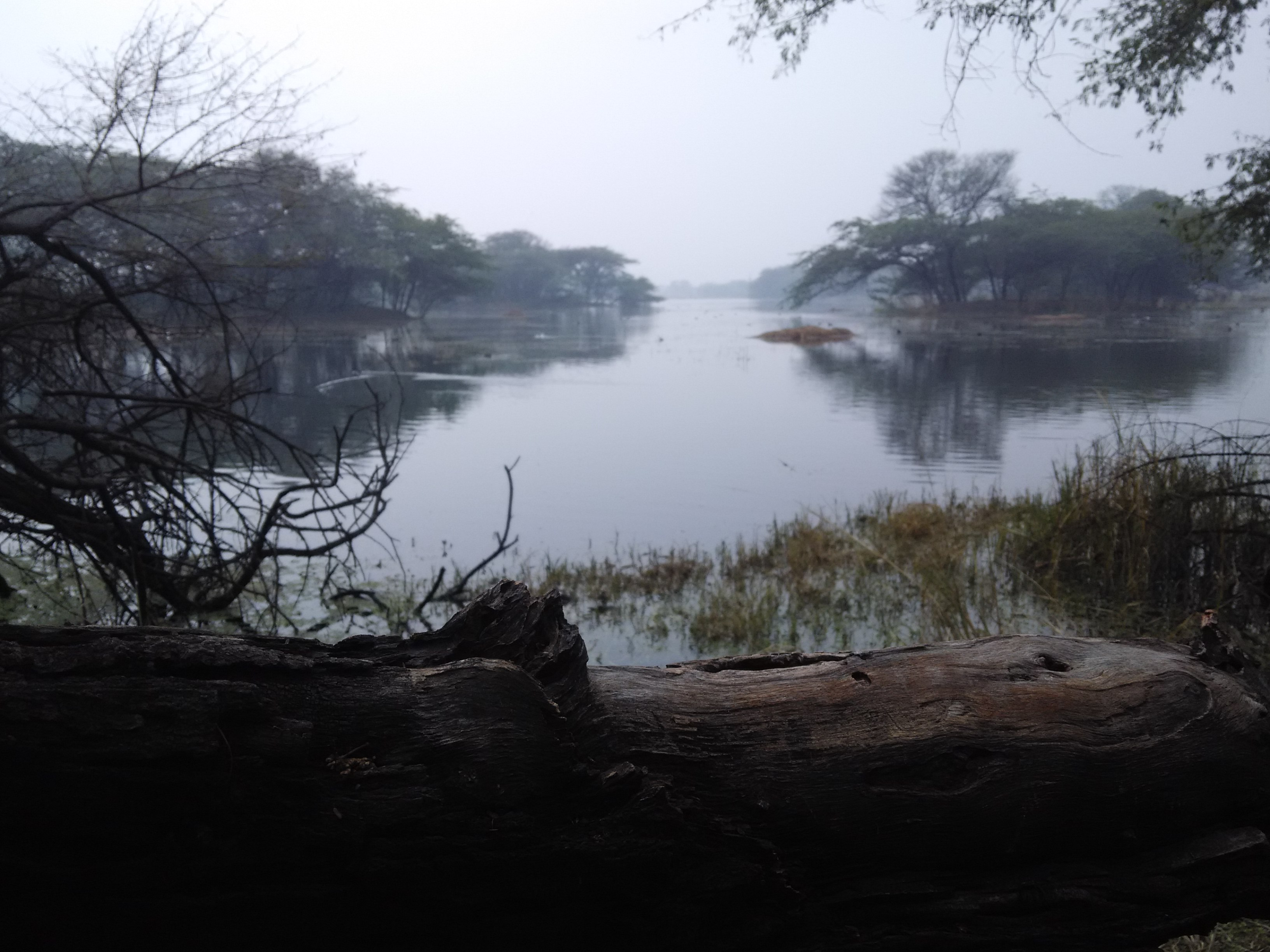
Sultanpur National Park in Haryana

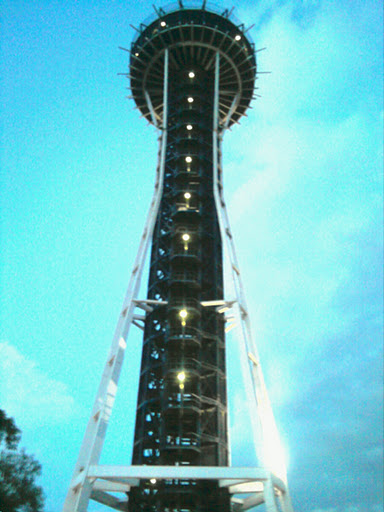
OP Jindal Gyan Kendra.

=== Paleolithic ===
- Mangar Bani:
  - History of human presence in Haryana dates back to 100,000 years ago. Archaeologists discovered cave paintings and tools in Mangar Bani hill forest in May 2021; the cave paintings are estimated to be 100,000 years old. These are world's oldest and largest collections of sites in the Indian subcontinent. Group of 43 sites was found in this area including Ankhir, Anangpur, Anangpur Dam, Shilakhari, Mangar Bani, Dhauj, Kot, Roj ka Gujjar, Nurpur, Dhumaspur, Surajkund, etc.
- Ghaggar-Hakra River's neolithic Stone Age
  - Paleolithic and Neolithic Stone Age (7000 BCE - 5500 BCE) find were excavated from the banks of the stream (paleochannel of Saraswati river) flowing through HMT complex, by the Guy Ellcock Pilgrim who was a British geologist and palaeontologist, who discovered 150,000 year old prehistoric human teeth and part of a jaw denoting that the ancient people, who were intelligent hominins dating as far back as 150,000 ybp Acheulean period, lived in Pinjore region near Chandigarh. Quartzite tools of Lower Paleolithic period were excavated in this region extending from Pinjore in Haryana to Nalagarh (Solan district) in Himachal Pradesh.

=== Neolithic ===
Neolithic sites are numerous in Haryana, specially the pre-IVC phases found at Bhirrana, Siswal, Rakhigarhi, Kunal, etc.

=== Vedic era ===
- Kurukshetra's 48 kos parikrama: Historic region with numerous religious and cultural sites connected to epic traditions and later history.
  - Jyotisar – Site promoted as the “birthplace of the Gita,” with associated temples and interpretation facilities.
  - Thanesar – Town that includes the Sthanesvar Mahadev Temple and other shrines in the Kurukshetra area.
  - Pehowa – A tirtha where rituals such as Pind Daan are performed at traditional ghats.
  - Panchkula – Access point for the Morni Hills area, including lakes such as Tikkar Tal.
  - Phalgu Tirth (Pharal) – Pilgrimage site in Kaithal district associated with Shraddha observances.
- Agroha Dham

=== Present day ===
- Gurgaon (officially Gurugram) is a major city and economic centre in Haryana; nearby Sultanpur National Park is a protected wetland and Ramsar Site known for resident and migratory waterbirds.

=== Religion ===
See Religious history of Haryana.

== Himachal Pradesh ==
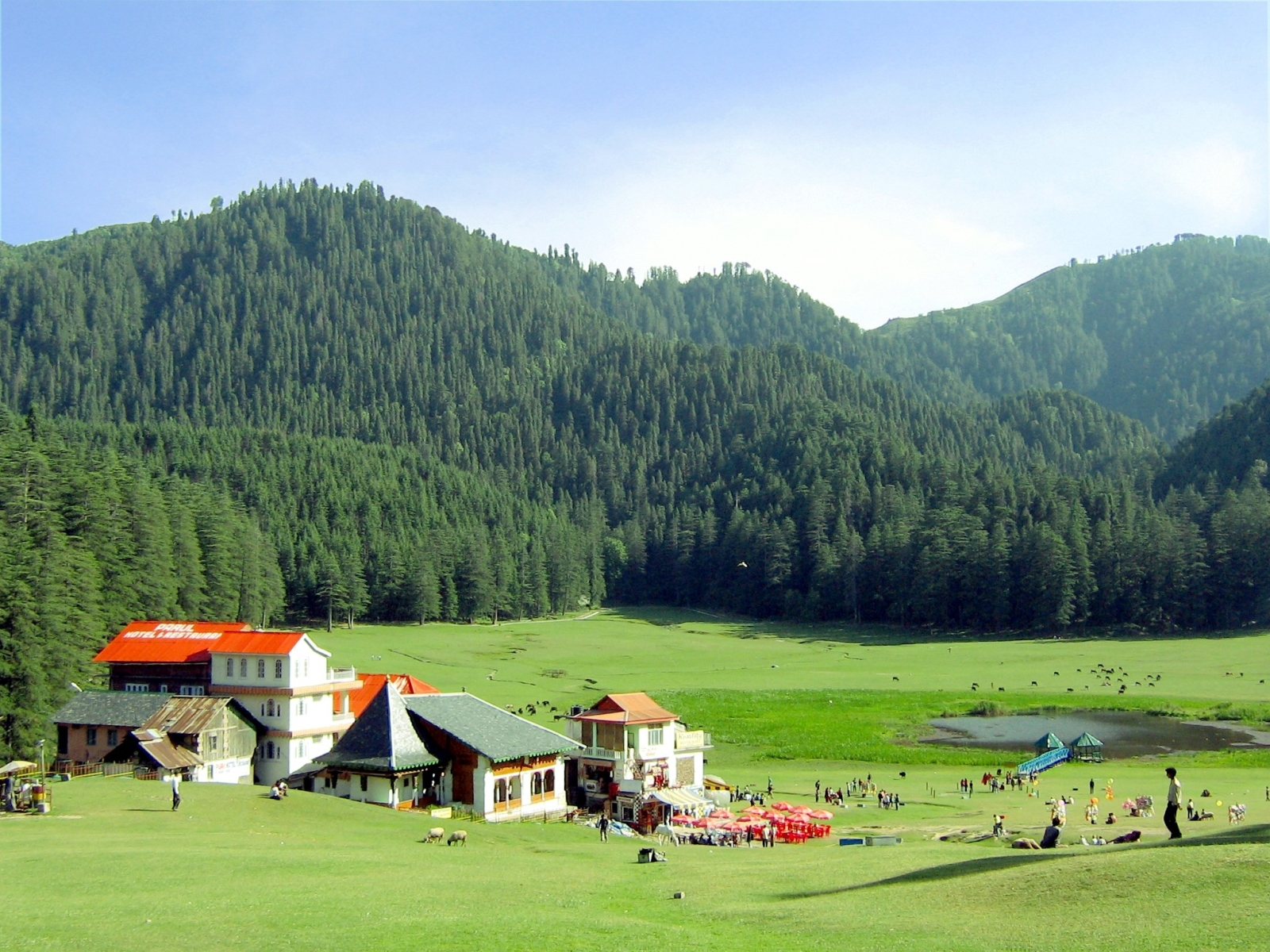
Khajjiar

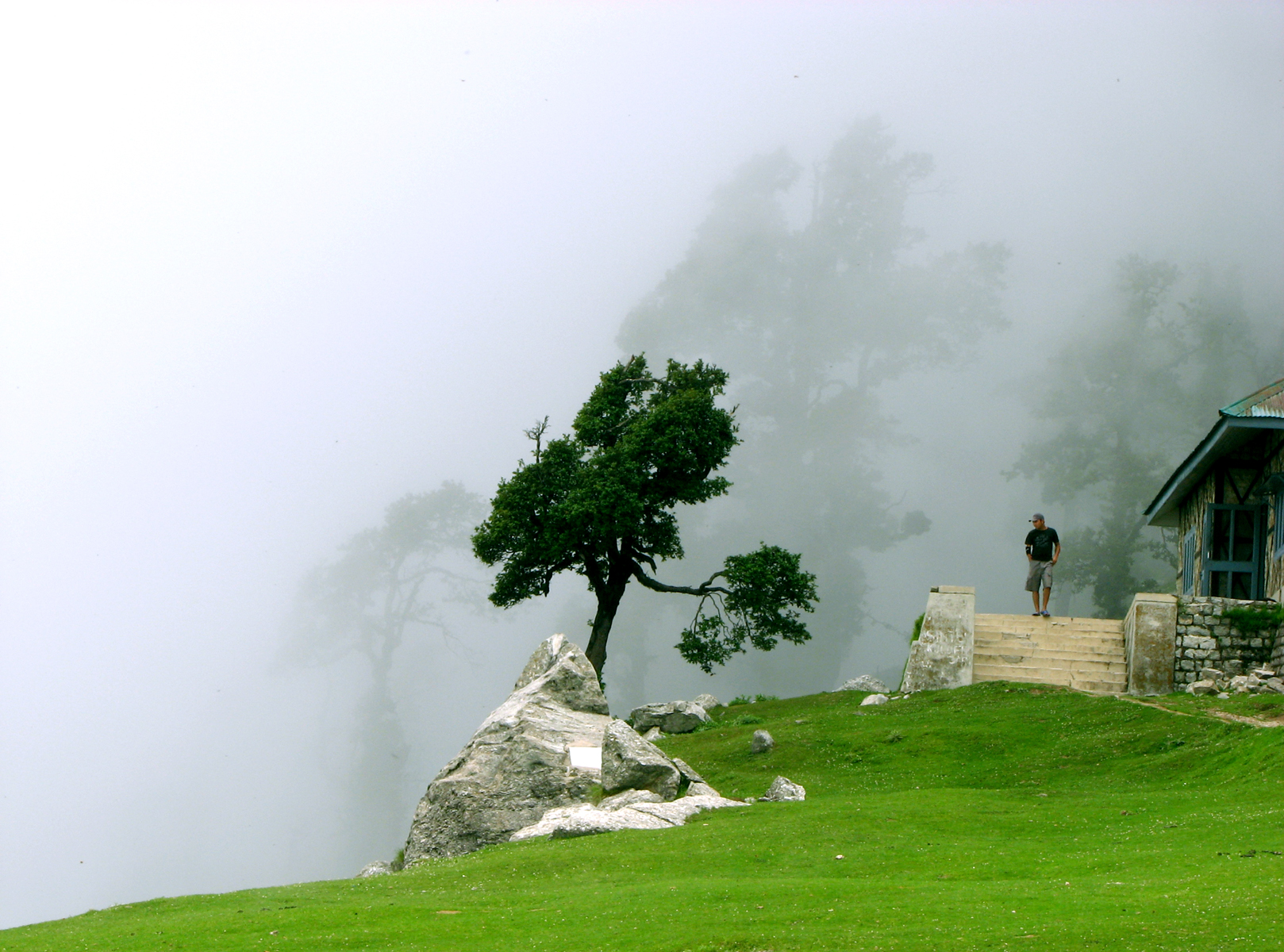
Triund

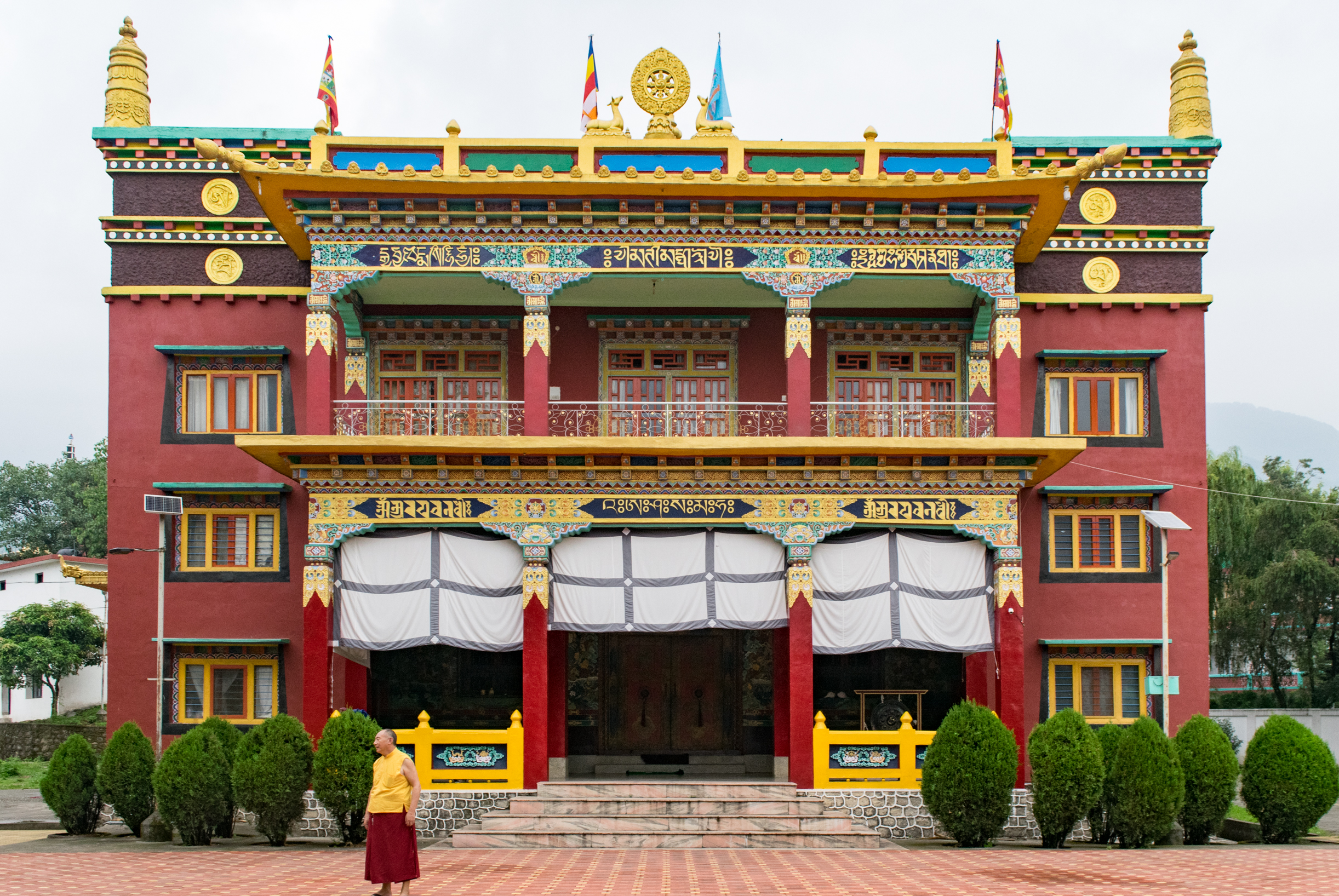
Monastery in Dharamshala

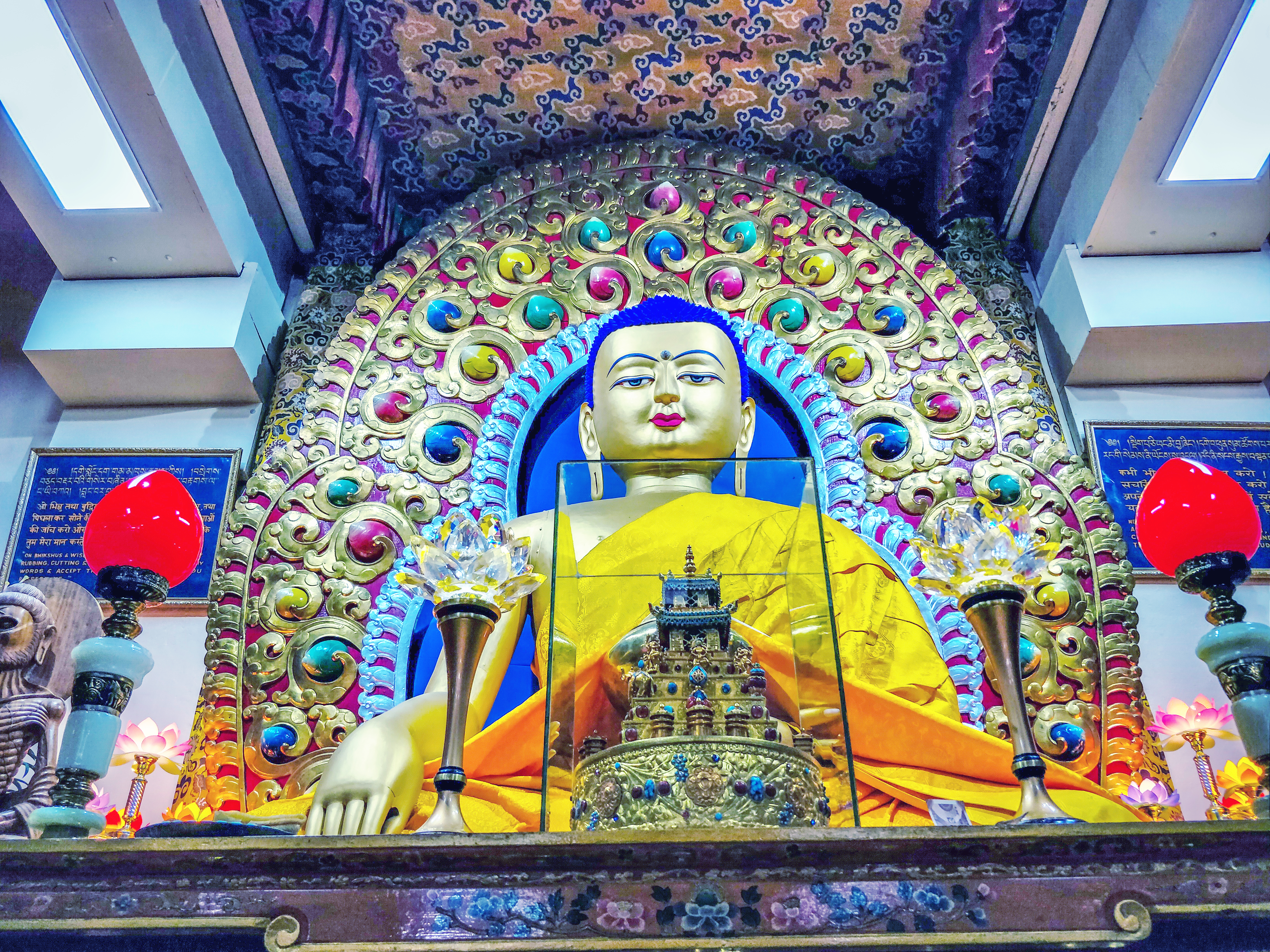
Dalai Lama Temple in Dharamshala

Himachal Pradesh is noted for Himalayan landscapes, hill stations, and outdoor recreation including rock climbing, mountain biking, paragliding, ice-skating, and heli-skiing.

Shimla, the state capital, is a popular hill station served by road, rail, and air; the Kalka–Shimla Railway is a narrow‑gauge line inscribed on UNESCO's "Mountain Railways of India." Other well-known hill stations include Manali, Dalhousie, and Kasauli.

Dharamshala—home to the headquarters of His Holiness the Dalai Lama has Tibetan monasteries and Buddhist temples and serves as a base for treks in the Kangra Valley and the Dhauladhar range. Bir and nearby Billing are noted paragliding sites in the district. The Spiti Valley is known for high‑altitude landscapes, monasteries, and villages in a cold‑desert environment.

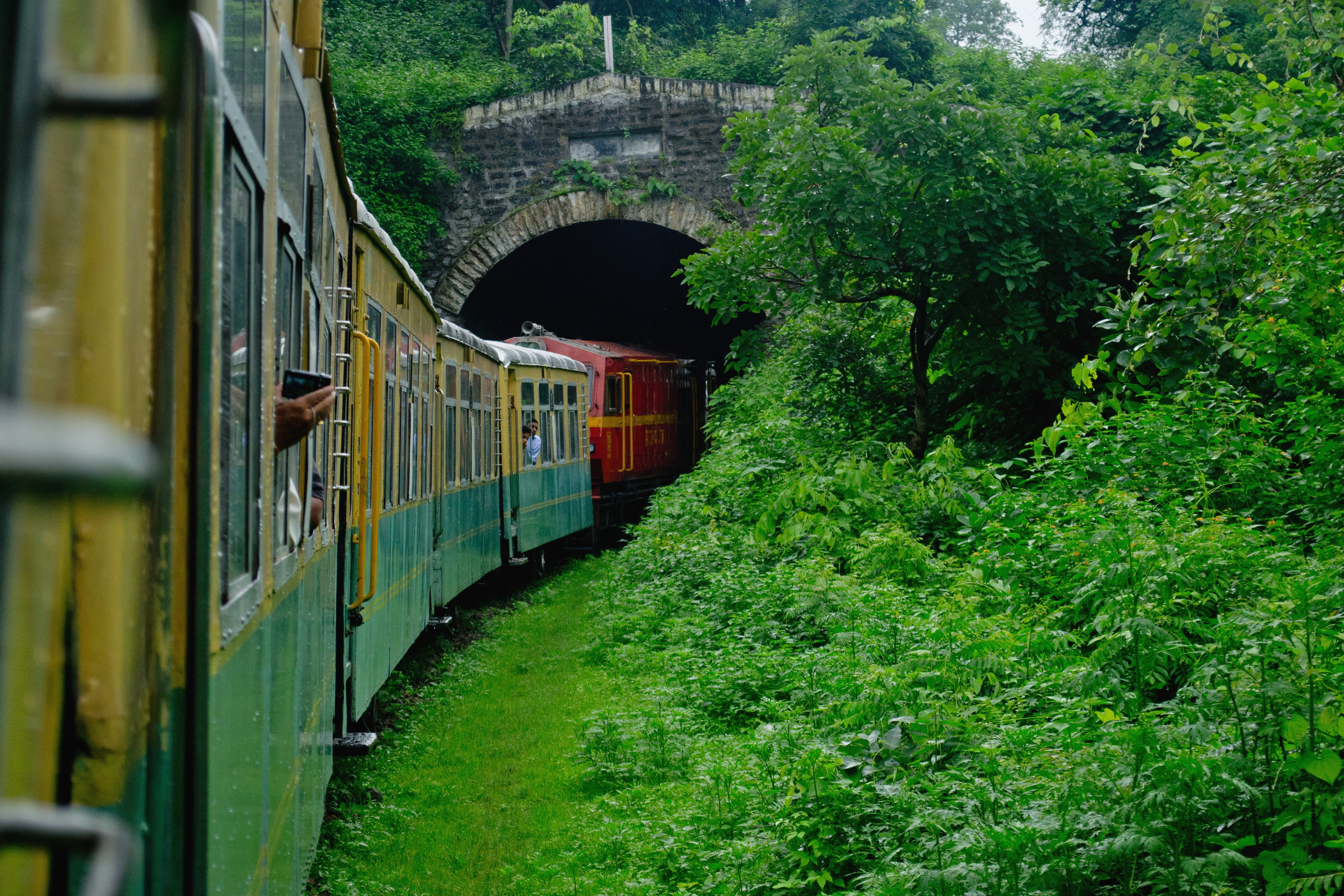
Kalka–Shimla Railway, part of UNESCO's Mountain Railways of India

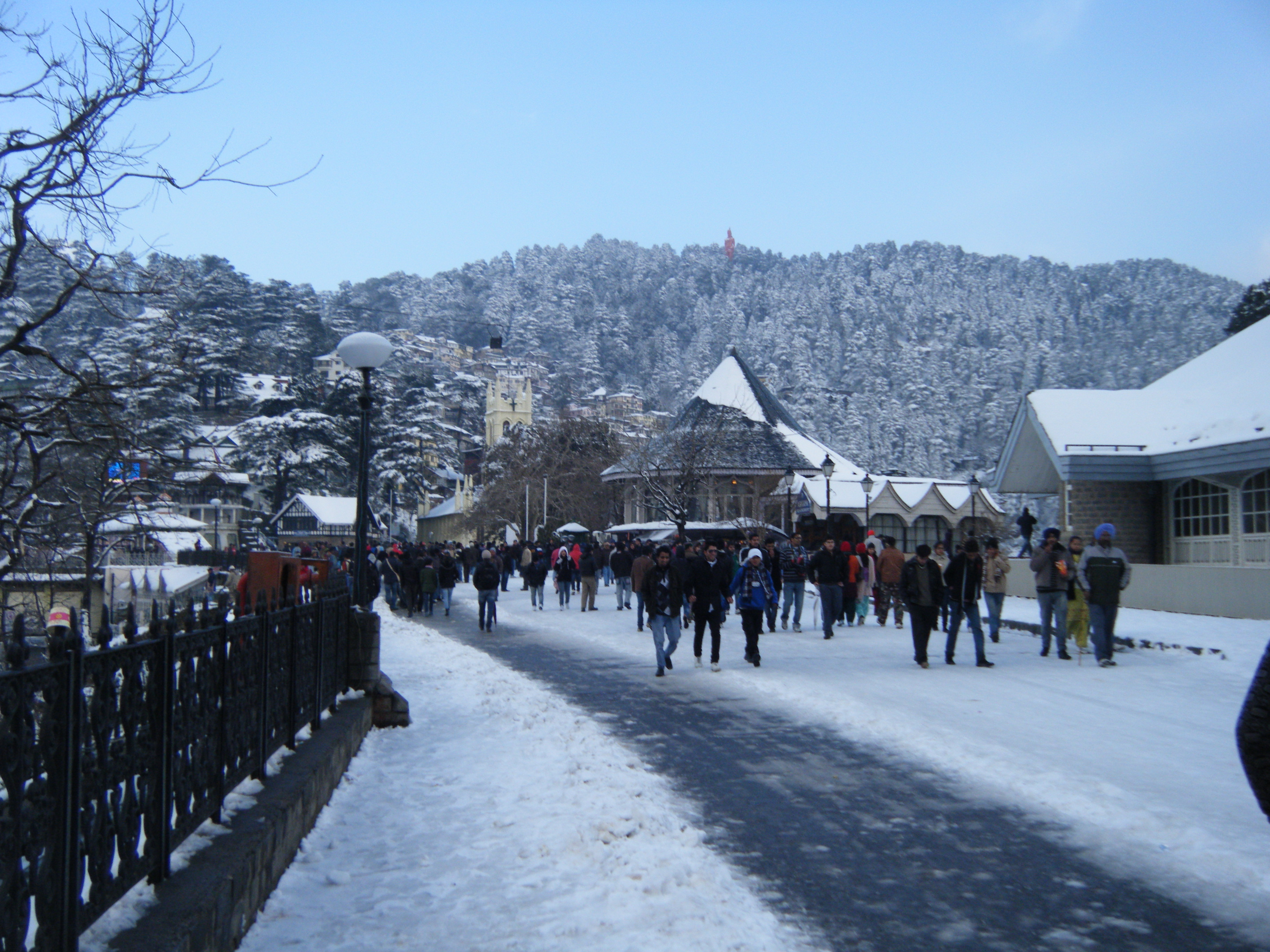
The Ridge, Shimla

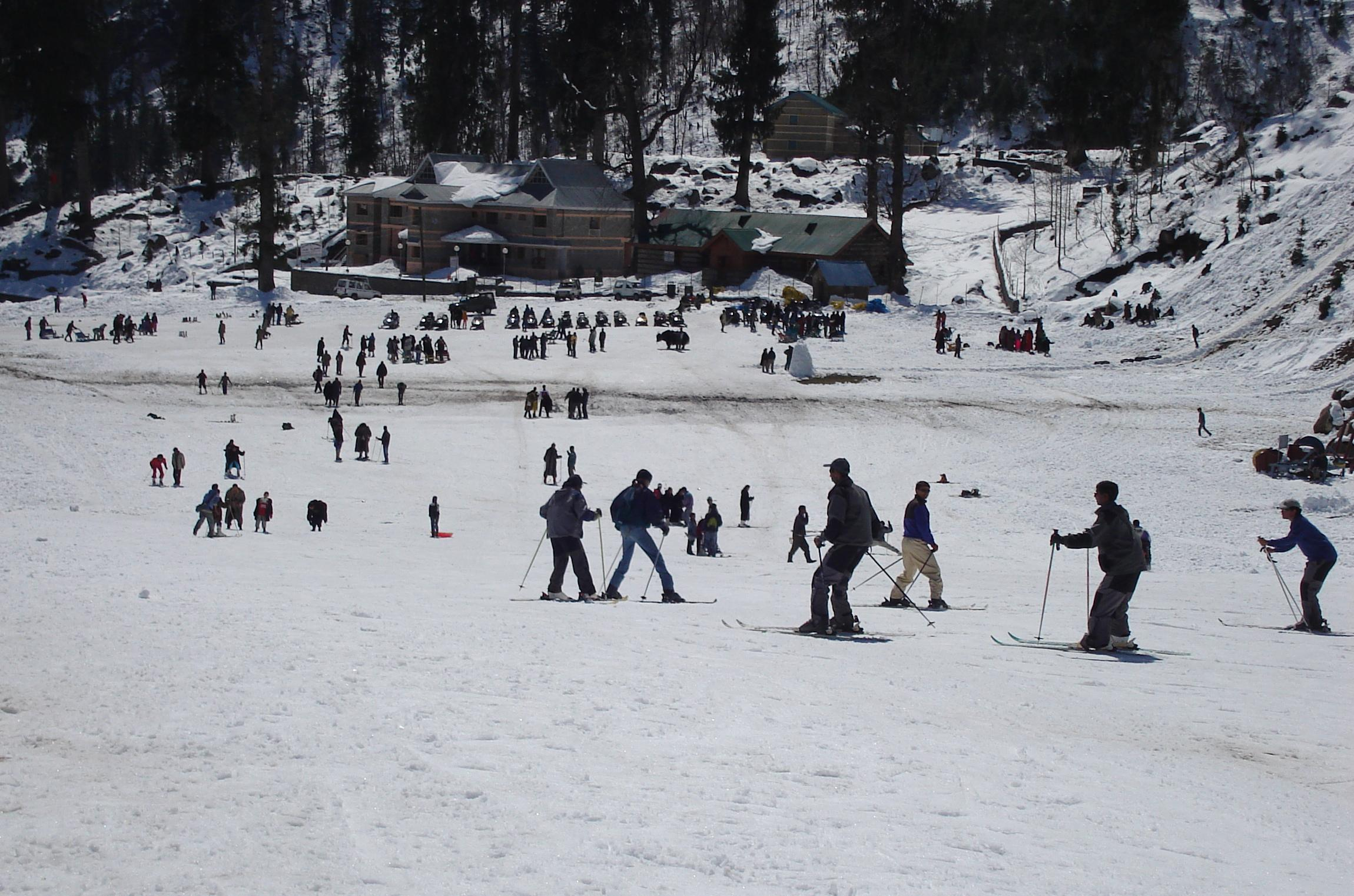
Skiing in Manali

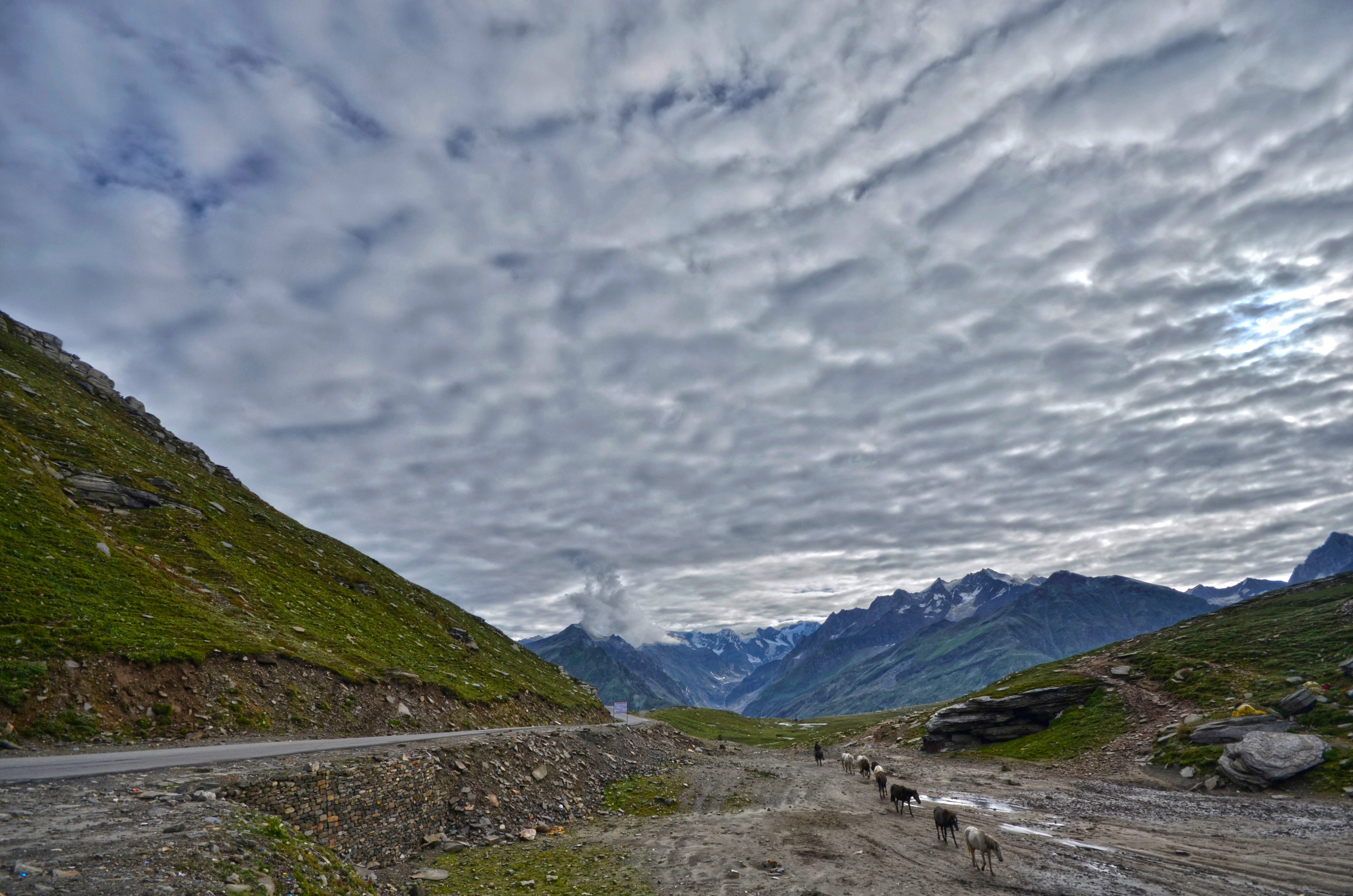
Rohtang Pass in Himachal Pradesh

== Jammu and Kashmir ==
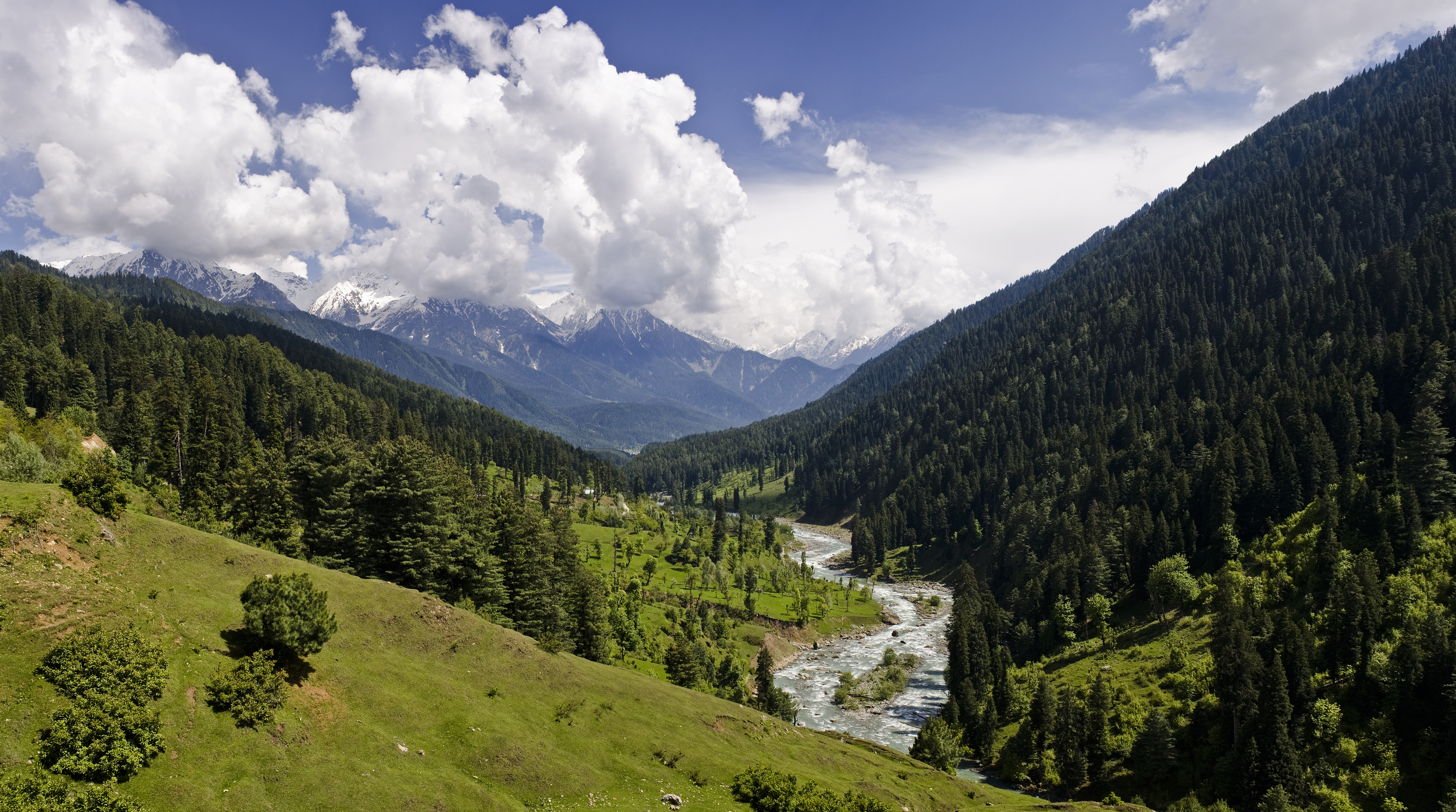
Jammu and Kashmir is known for mountain landscapes and valleys

Kashmir features lakes, gardens, and religious shrines alongside historic temples and mosques across destinations such as Srinagar, Pahalgam, and Gulmarg. Major pilgrimages include Vaishno Devi, which recorded 95.22 lakh pilgrims in 2023, and the annual Amarnath Yatra, which saw about 3.69 lakh pilgrims in 2023.

Tourist attractions include Dal Lake and the Mughal gardens of Srinagar, meadows and rivers in Pahalgam, and alpine slopes around Gulmarg; nearby valleys such as Yusmarg are also visited for outdoor recreation.

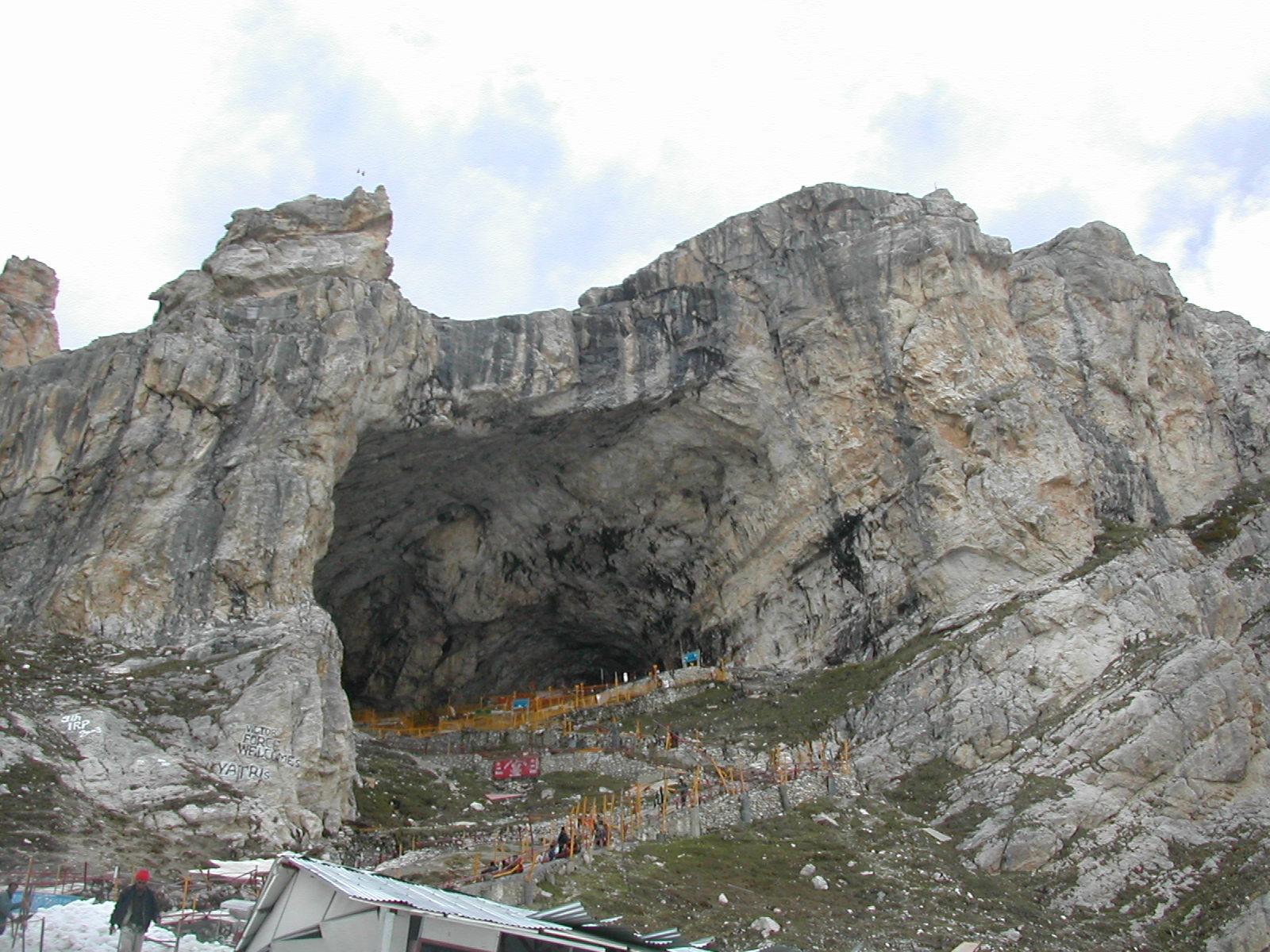
Amarnath Temple near Pahalgam (open during the summer pilgrimage season)

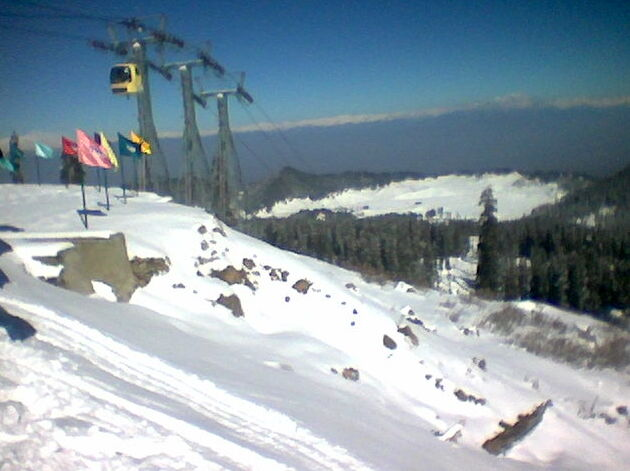
Gulmarg Gondola cable car in winter

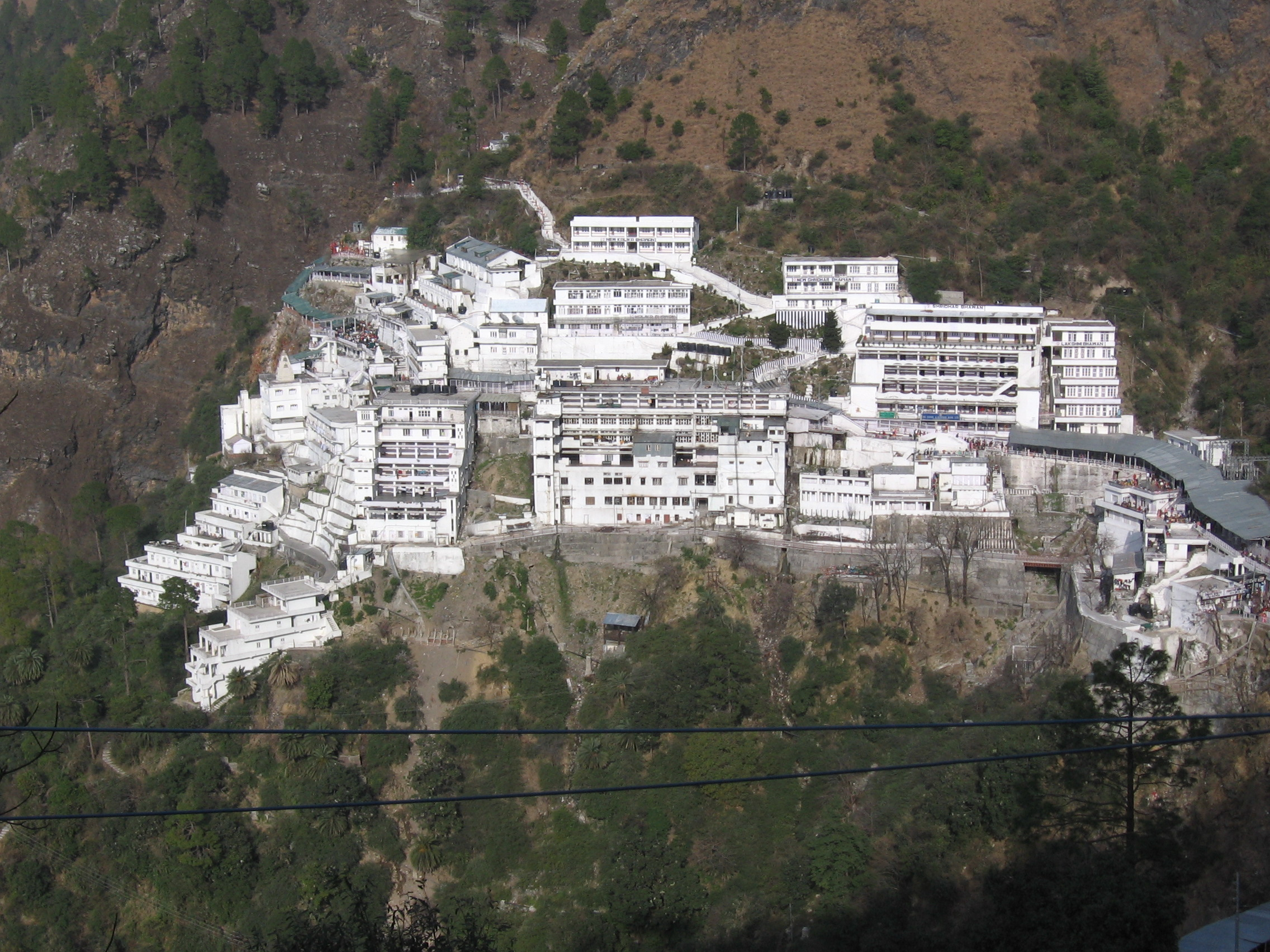
Vaishno Devi Temple near Jammu

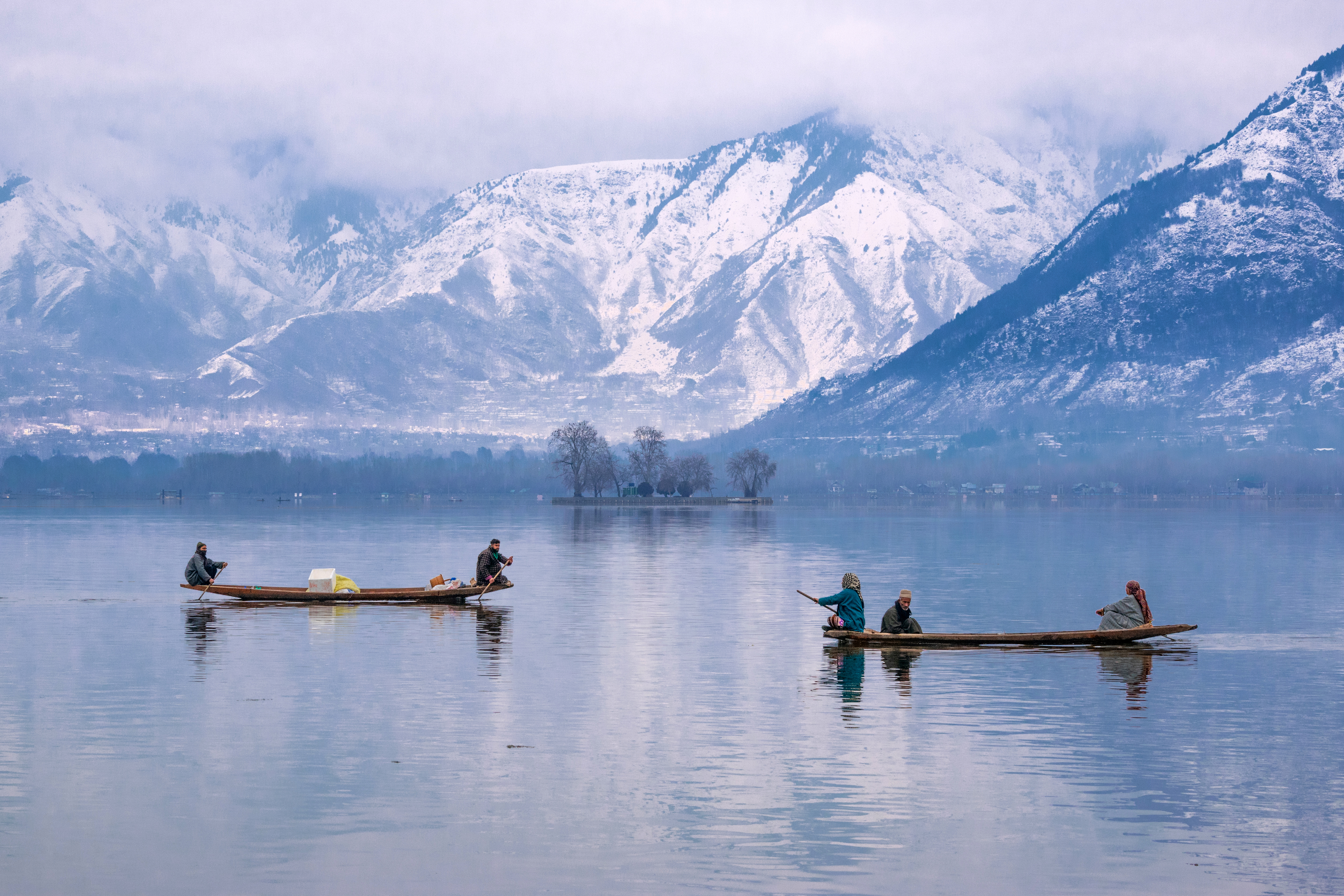
Dal Lake in central Srinagar

== Jharkhand ==
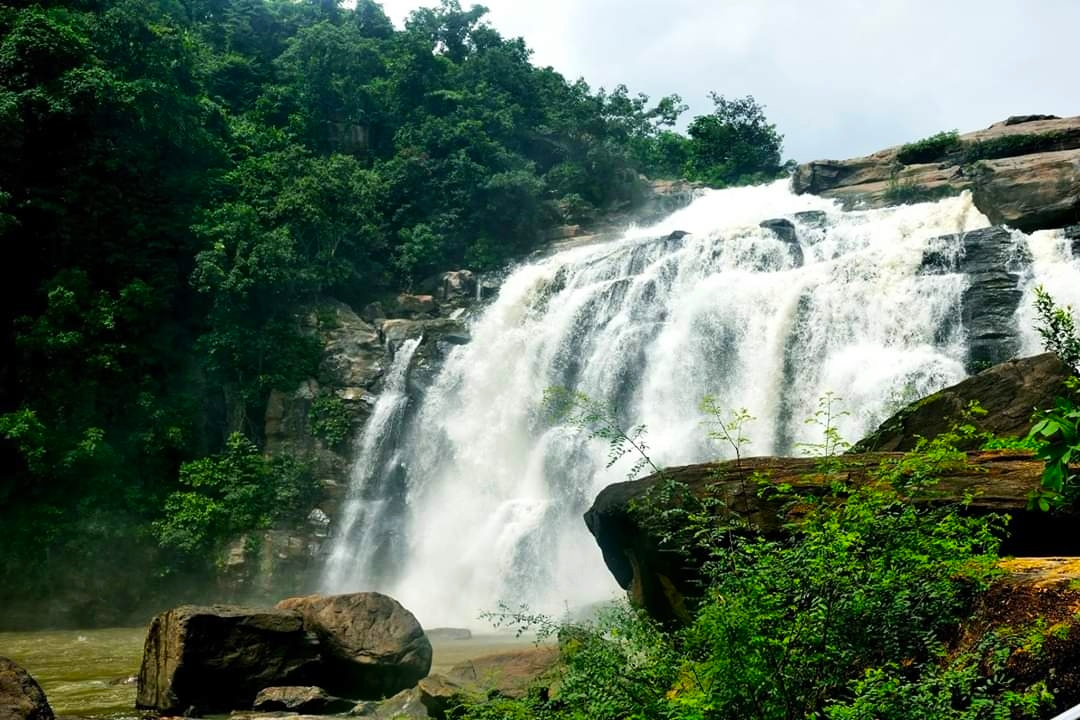
Jonha Falls near Ranchi

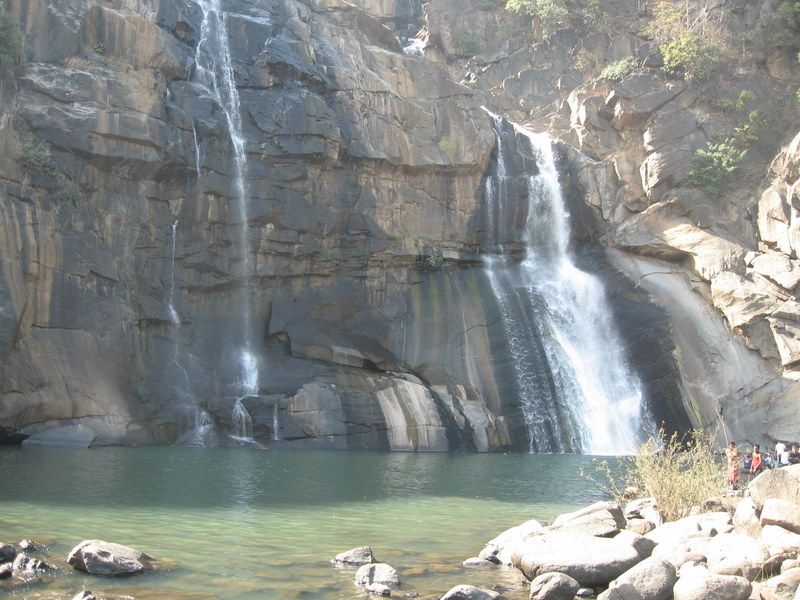
Hundru Falls near Ranchi

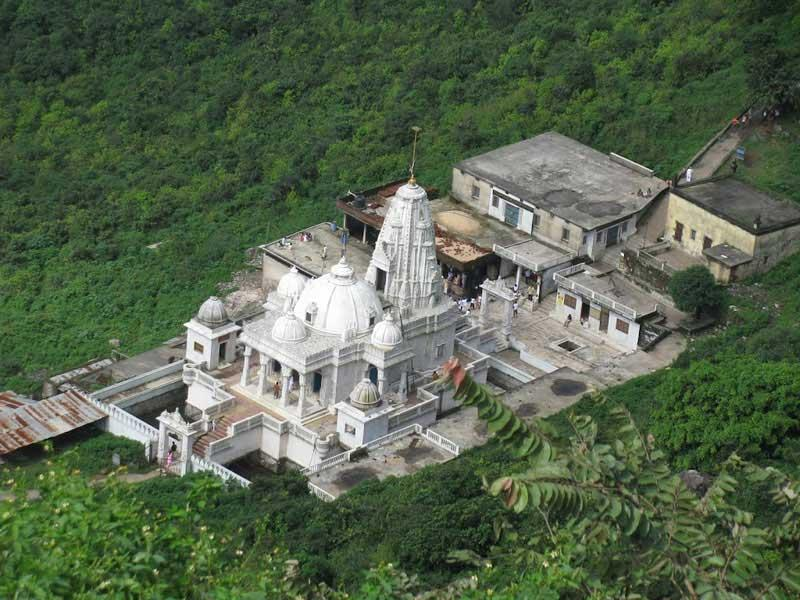
Jal Mandir at Shikharji

Jharkhand is a state in eastern India formed on 15 November 2000. Notable attractions include waterfalls near Ranchi, major Hindu and Jain pilgrimage centres, and protected forests and wildlife areas.

Baidyanath (Baidyanath Dham) at Deoghar is among the twelve jyotirlingas of Shiva and is a focal point during the Shravani Mela.

Shikharji, on Parasnath hill (the highest peak in Jharkhand), is a major Jain tirtha. Jain tradition holds that twenty of the twenty-four tirthankaras attained moksha here.

Ranchi, the state capital, is known for waterfalls on its outskirts, including Jonha Falls and Hundru Falls.

Protected areas include Palamau Tiger Reserve (part of Betla National Park) and Topchanchi Wildlife Sanctuary.

== Karnataka ==
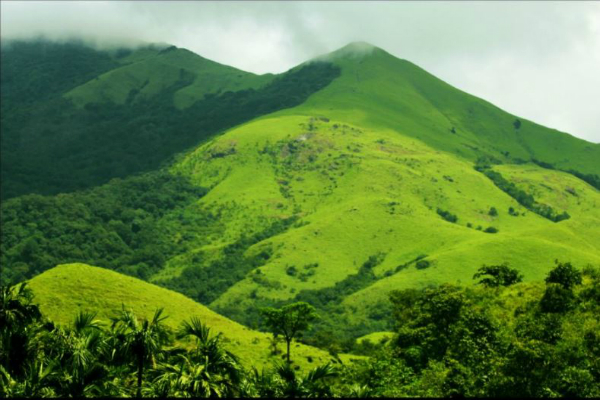
Kumara Parvatha in the Coorg, Western Ghats

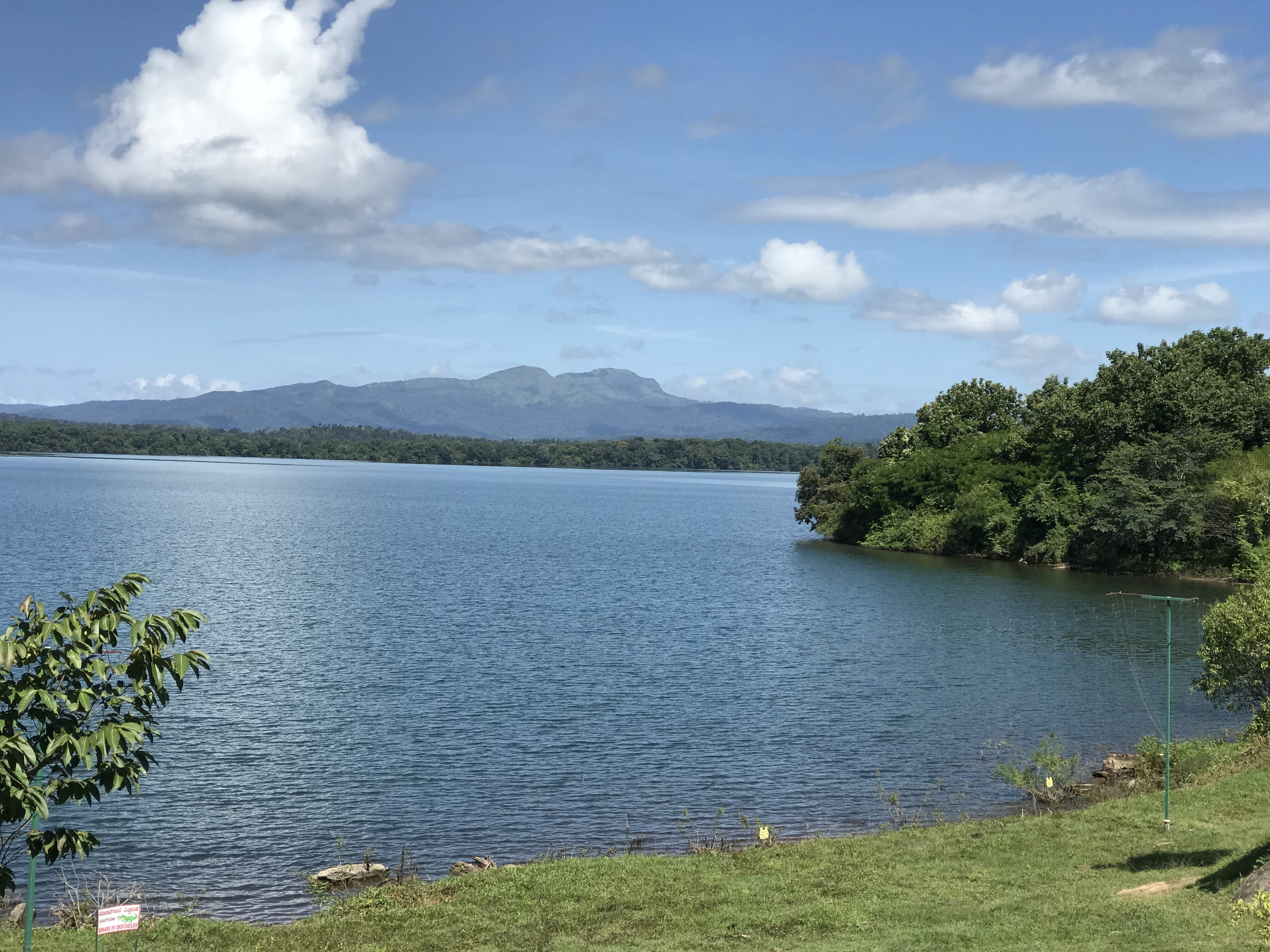
Harangi Reservoir in Kodagu

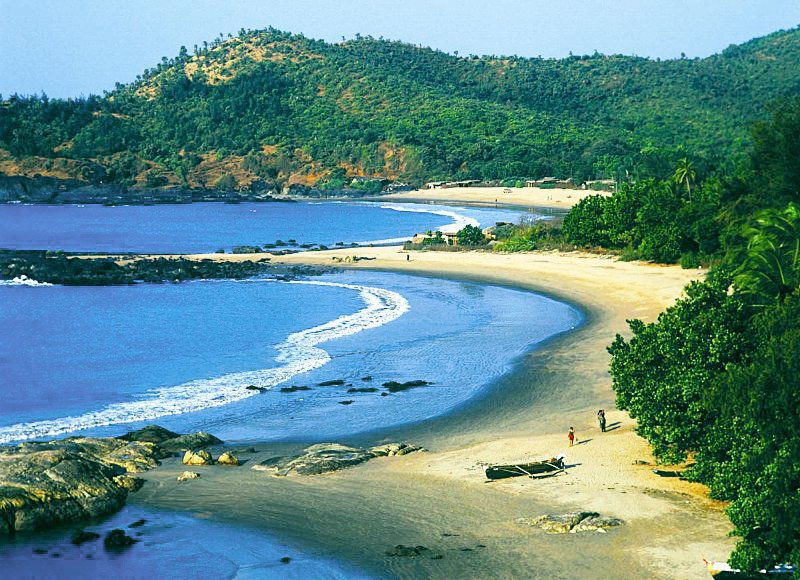
Gokarna on the Arabian Sea coast

Karnataka features major cultural heritage sites, coastal and Western Ghats landscapes like Coorg and Chikkamagaluru, waterfalls, and wildlife reserves. The state's UNESCO World Heritage properties include the Group of Monuments at Hampi and the Group of Monuments at Pattadakal.

The Western Ghats host popular treks to peaks such as Tadiandamol and Kumara Parvatha (Pushpagiri), while coastal destinations include Gokarna and nearby beaches. Jog Falls on the Sharavathi River is a notable waterfall, especially during the monsoon.

Historic monuments span Buddhist, Jain, Hindu, and Indo-Islamic traditions, with temple and urban remains at Hampi and Chalukyan-era temples at Pattadakal, among other sites across the state. Gol Gumbaz at Vijayapura is noted for its massive dome and whispering gallery.

Karnataka's protected landscapes support significant populations of tigers and Asian elephants, with multiple tiger landscapes in the Western Ghats and documented statewide elephant populations in recent assessments.

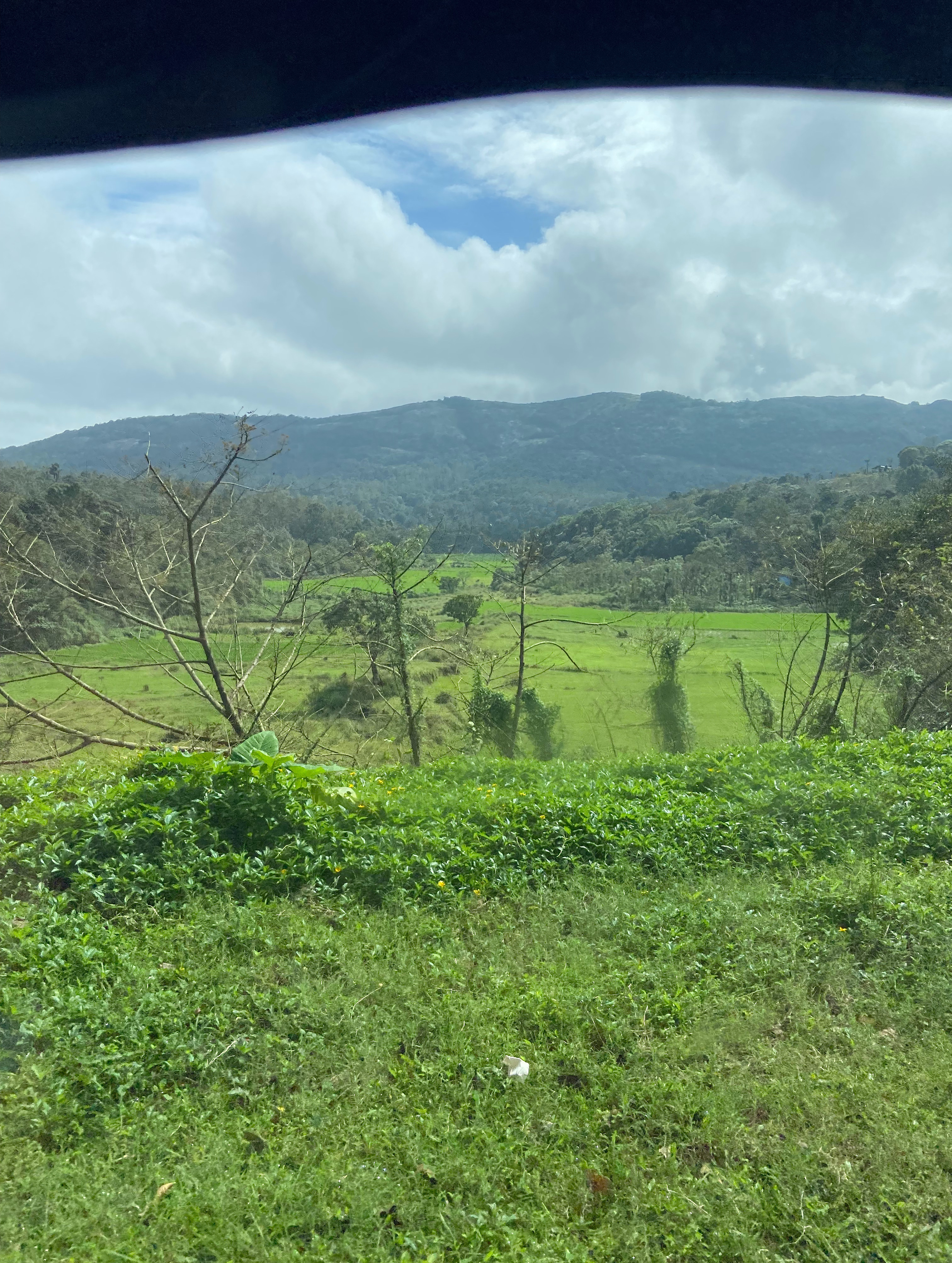
Coorg landscape on Mallalli Rd.

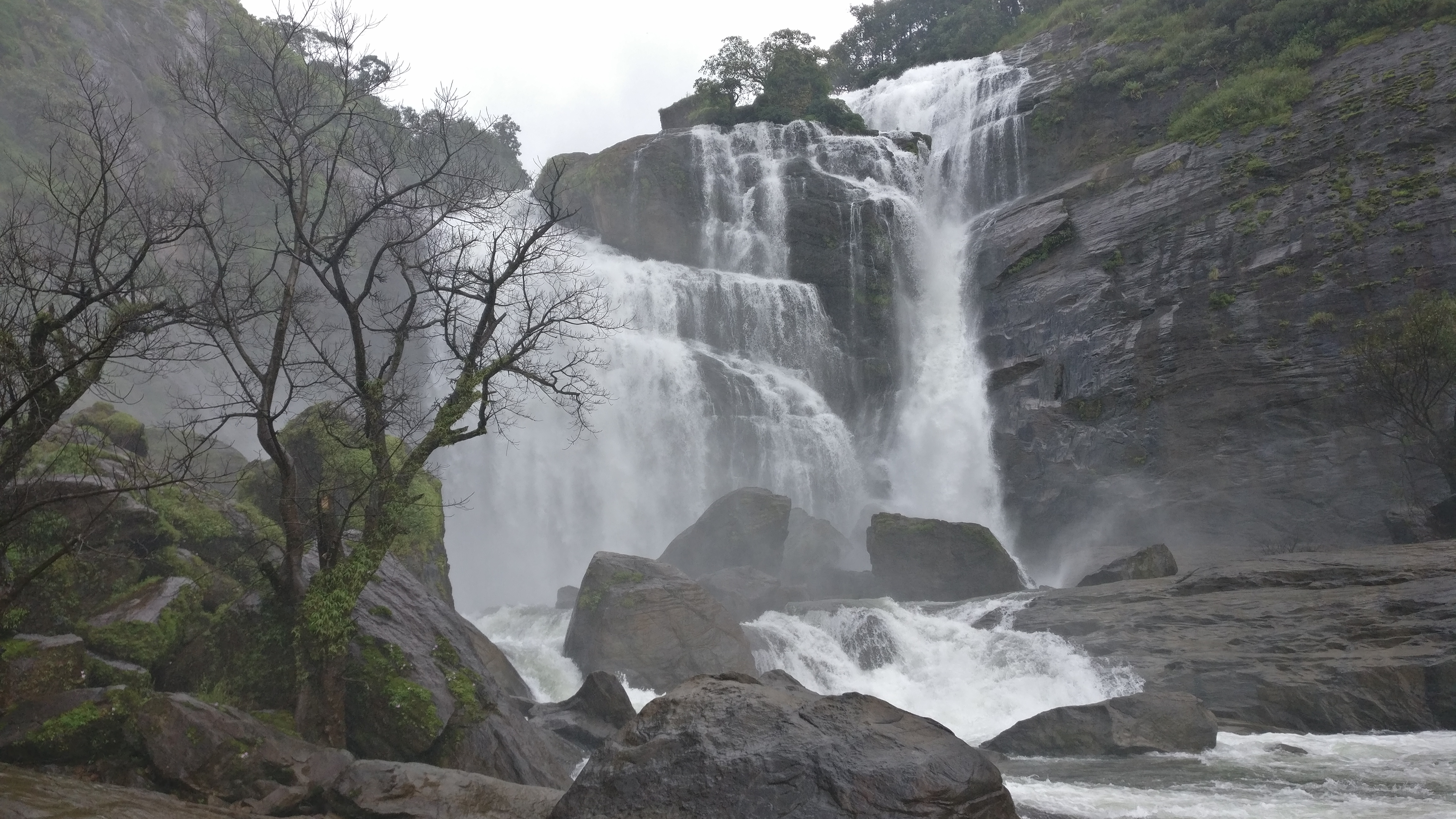
Mallalli Falls

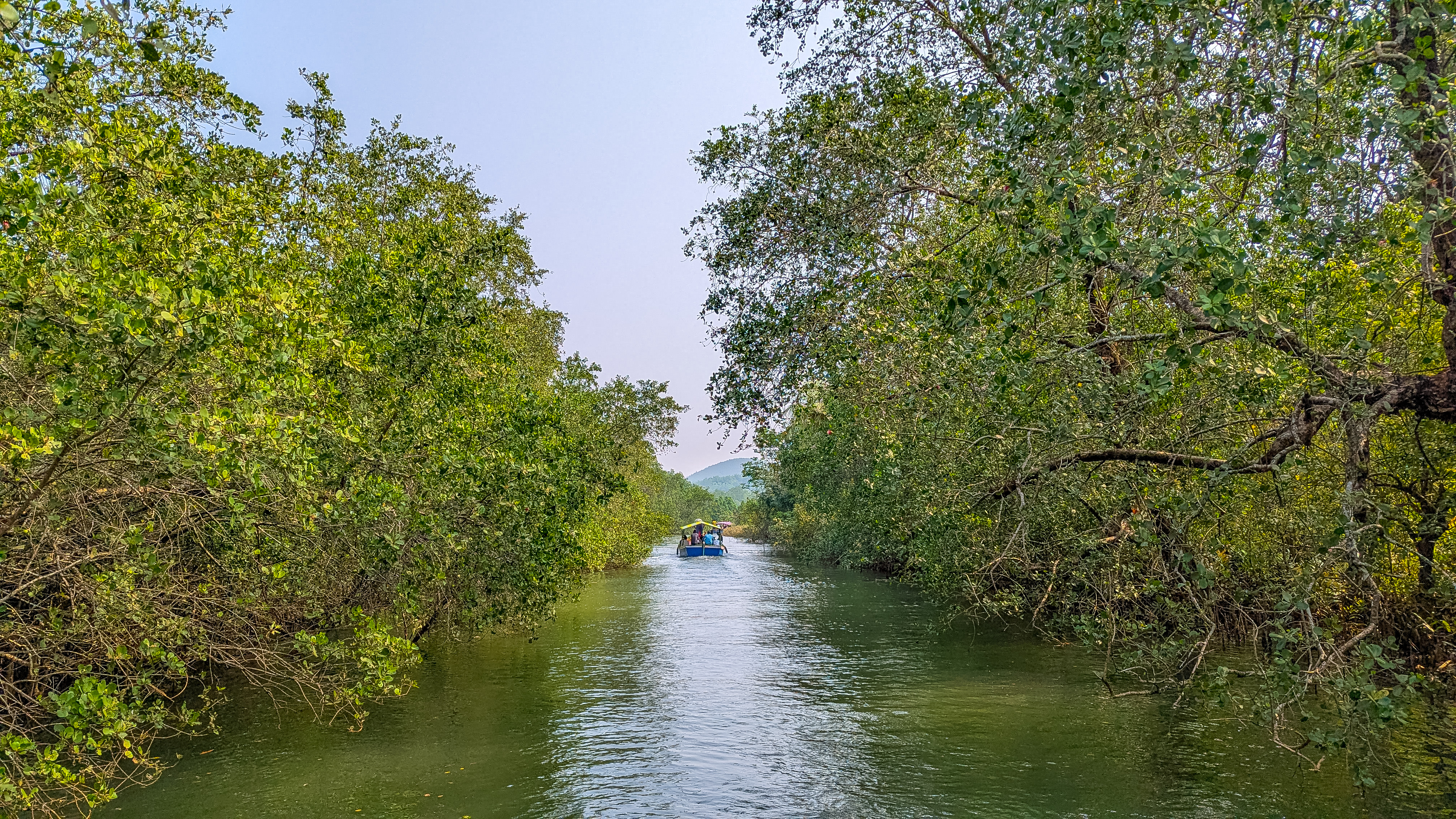
Honnavar backwaters boating

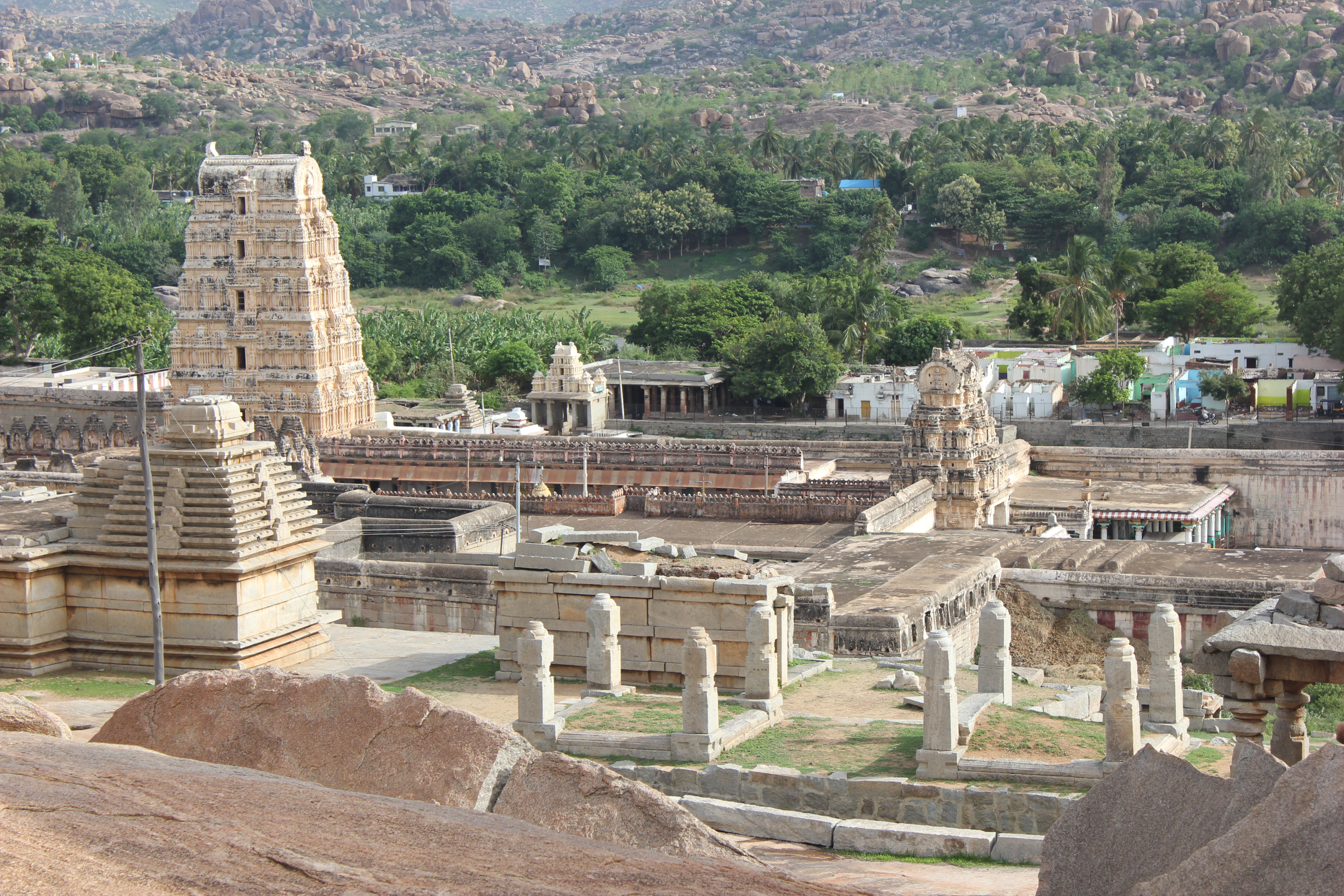
Hampi, a UNESCO World Heritage Site

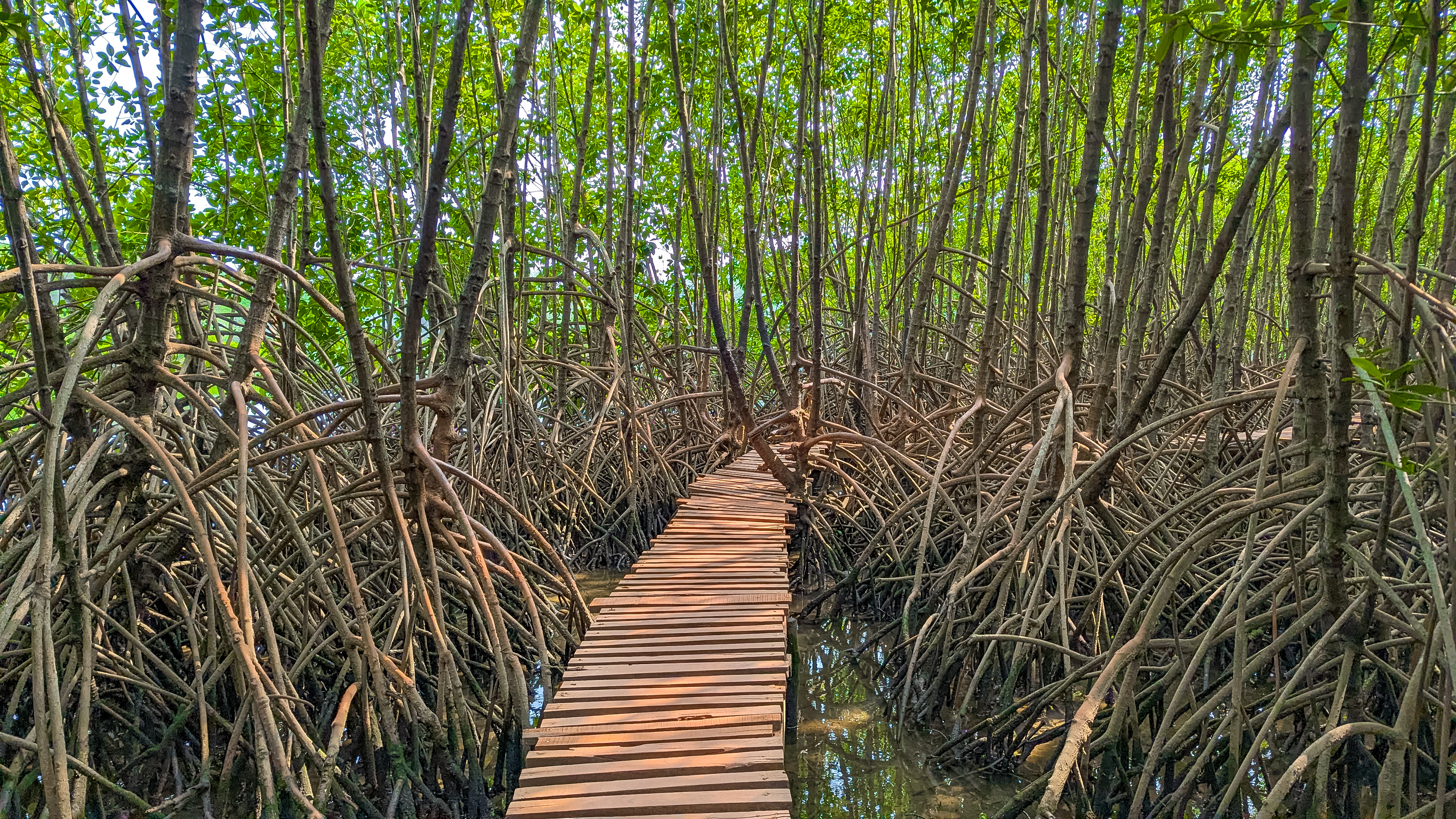
Honnavar Mangrove Boardwalk

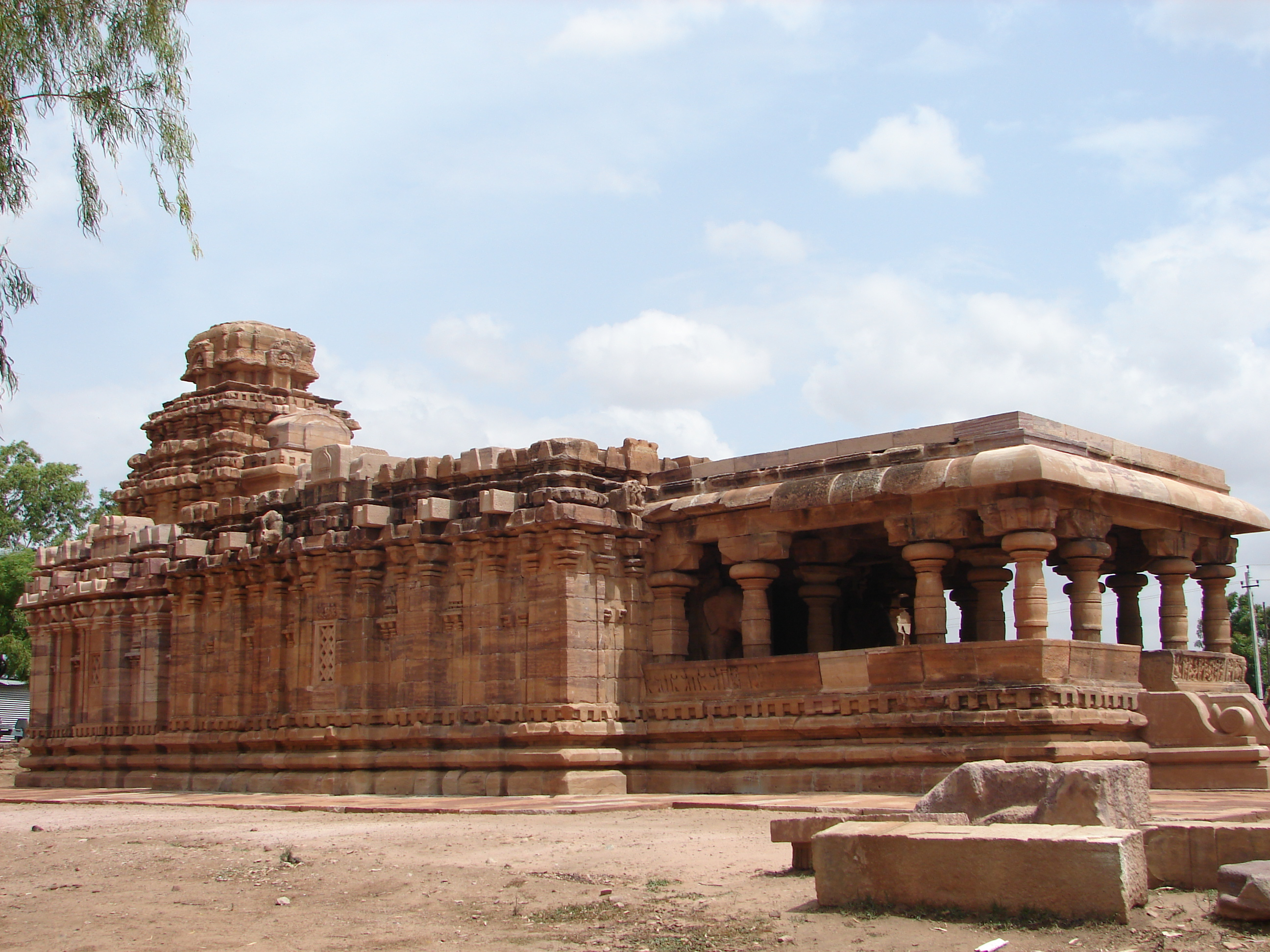
Jain Narayana temple at Pattadakal, a UNESCO World Heritage Site

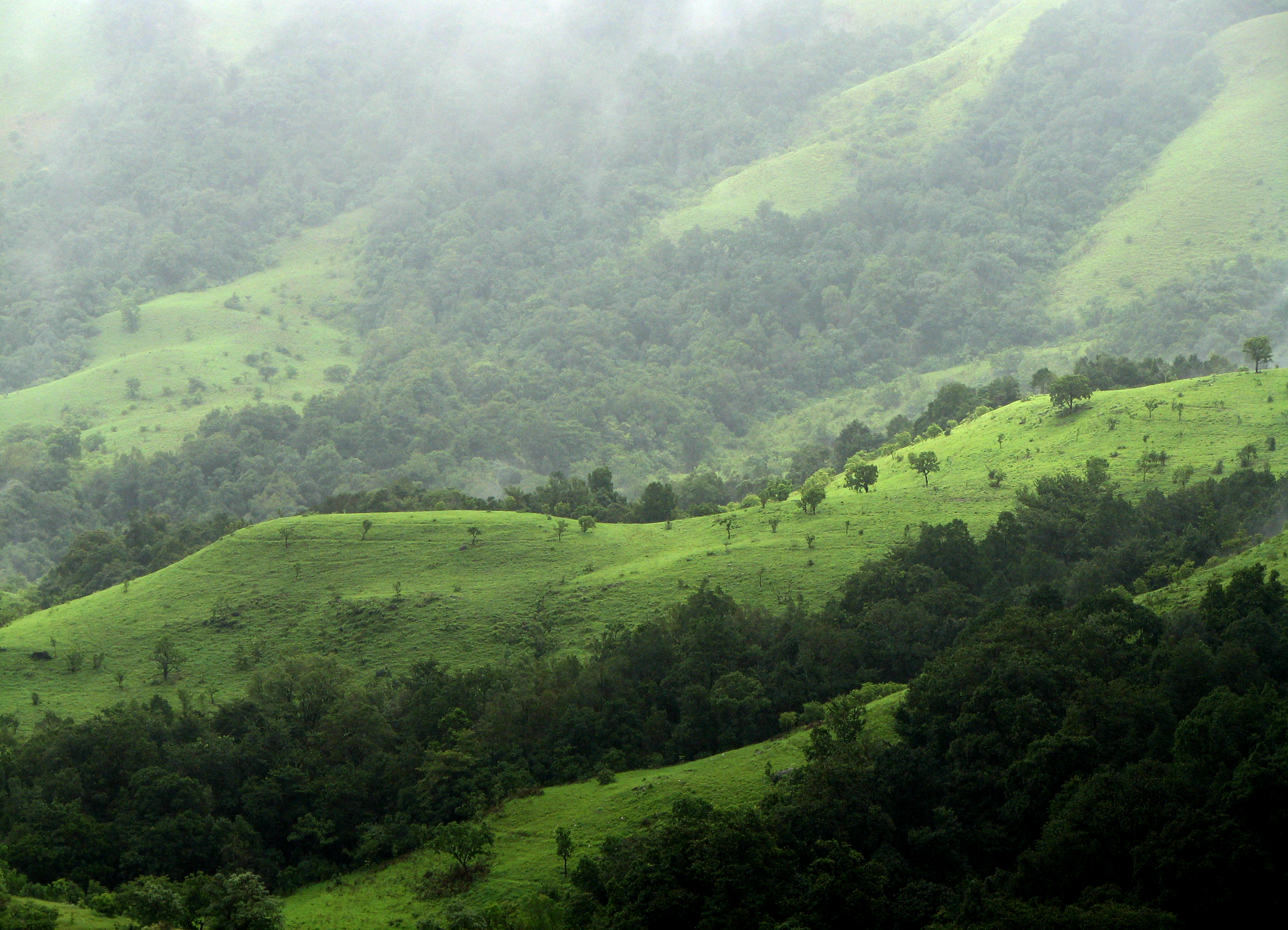
Kudremukha National Park

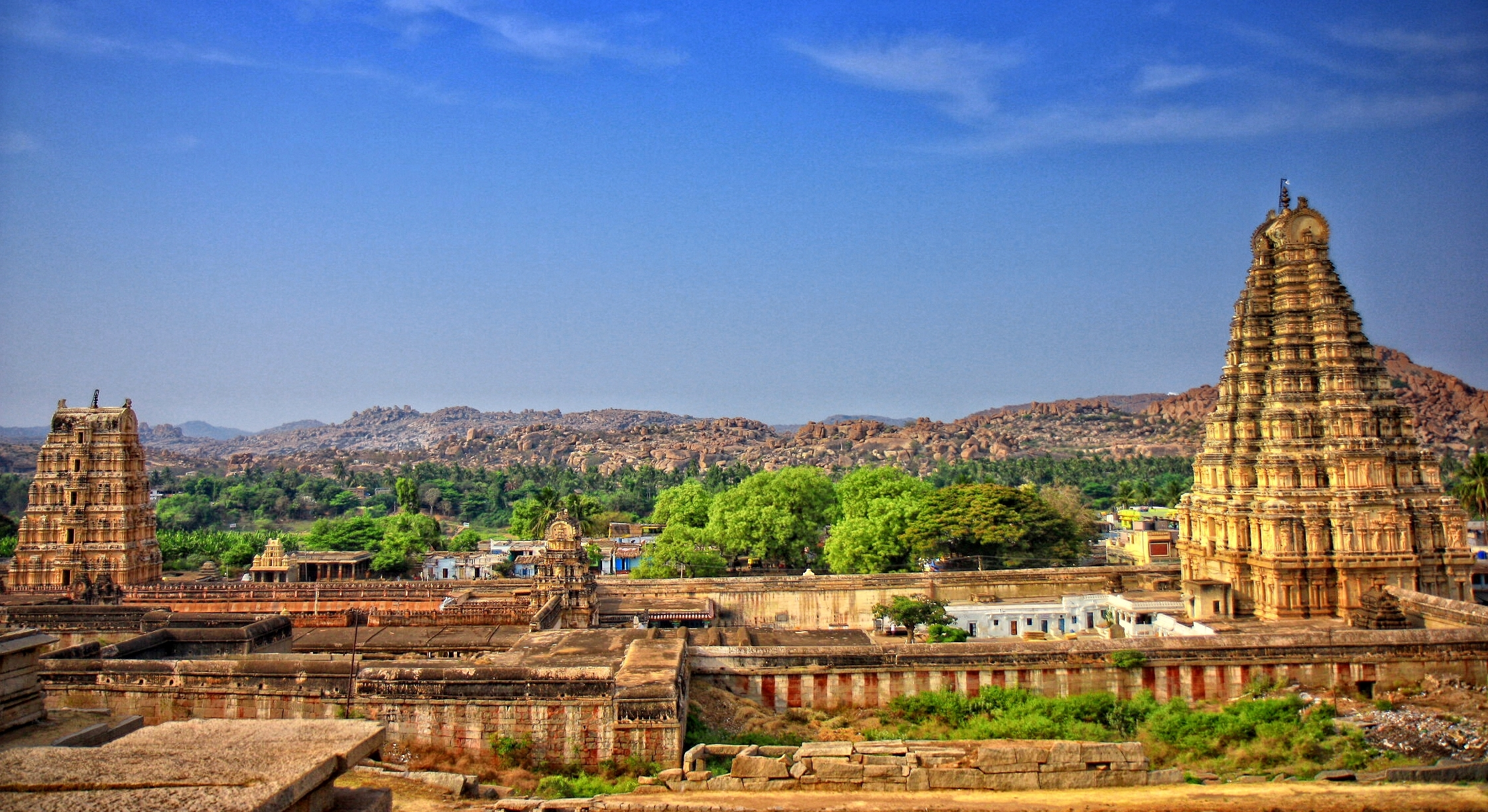
Virupaksha Temple at Hampi

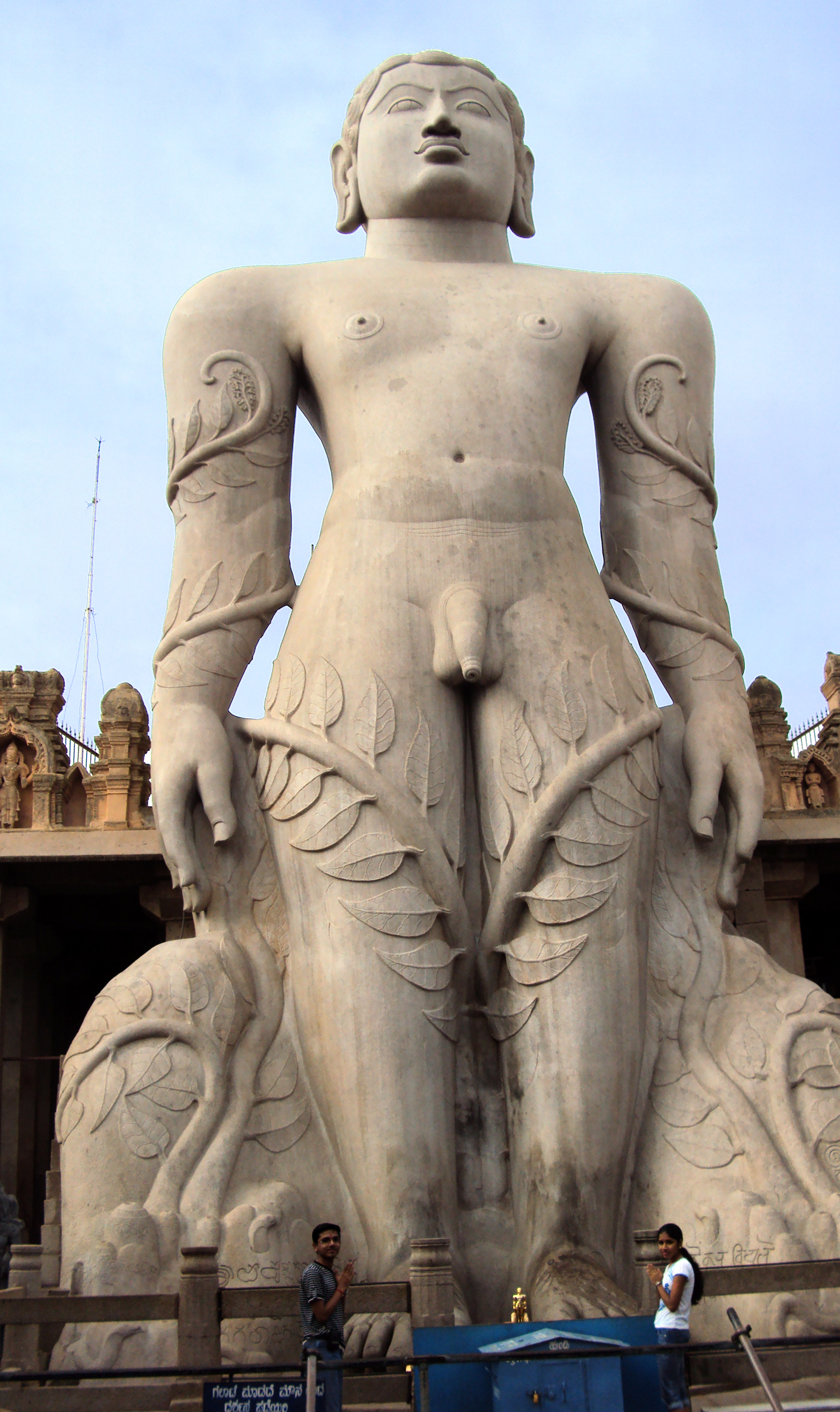
Gommateshwara statue at Shravanabelagola

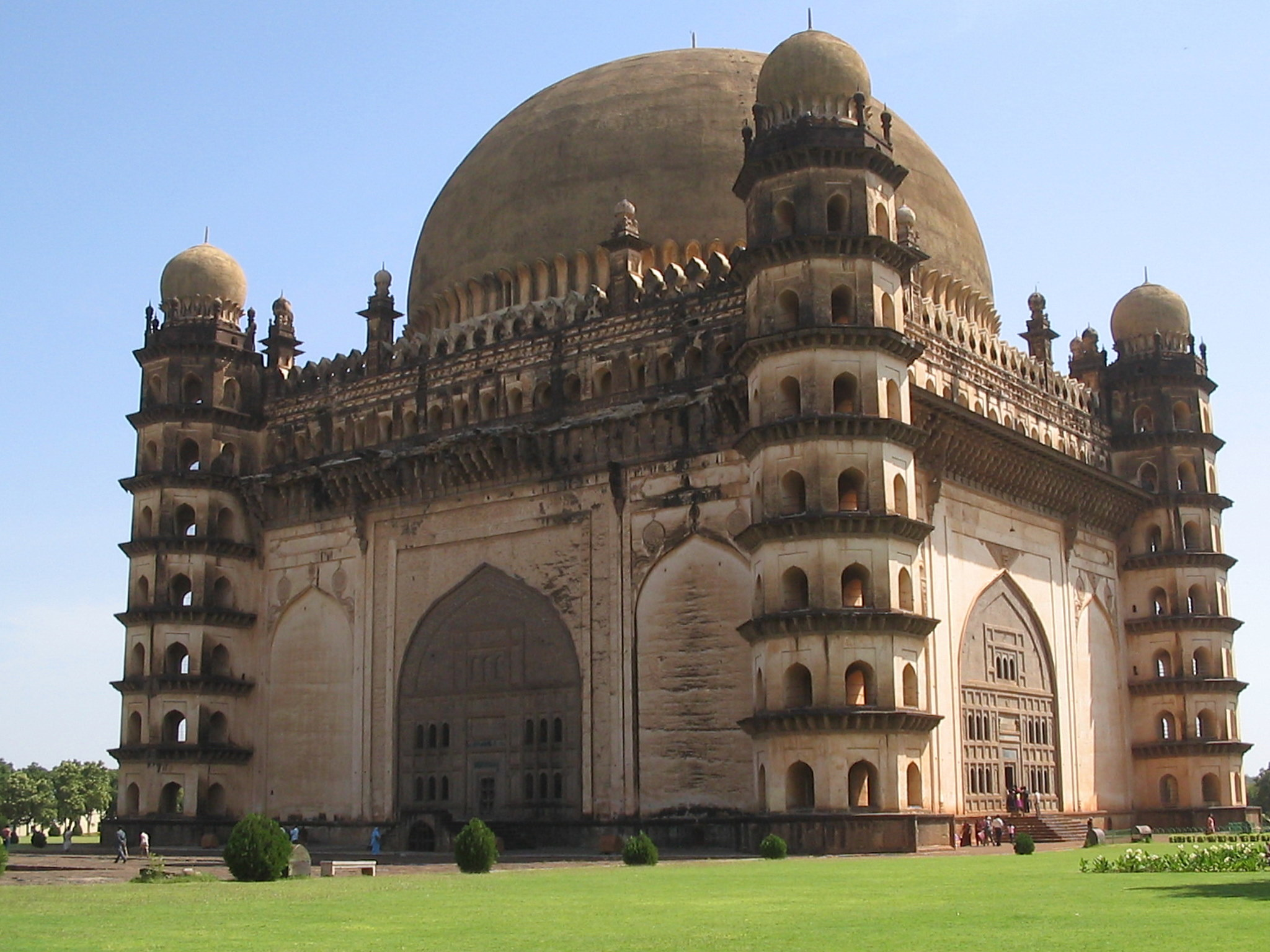
Gol Gumbaz in Vijayapura

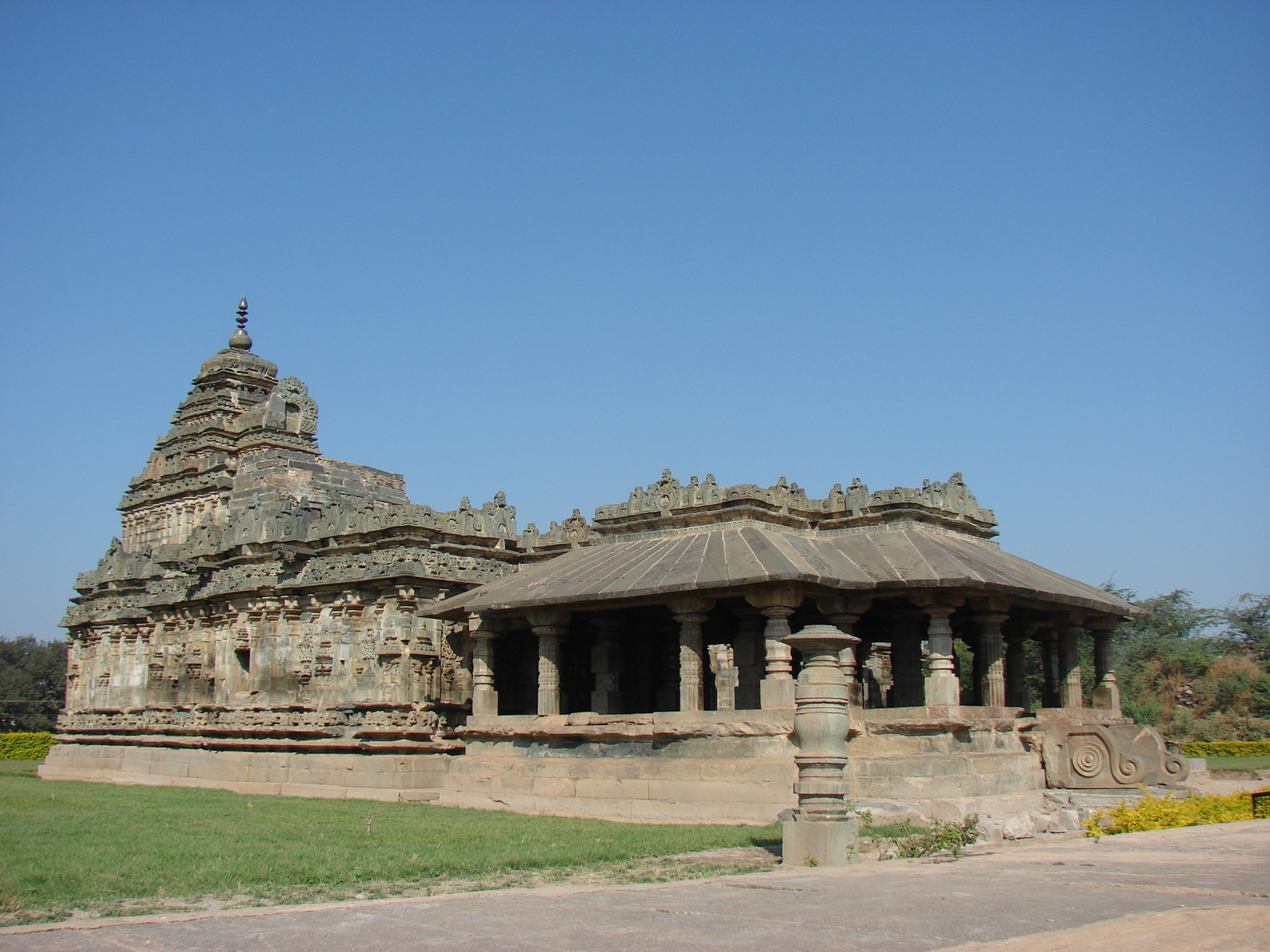
Brahma Jinalaya, Lakkundi

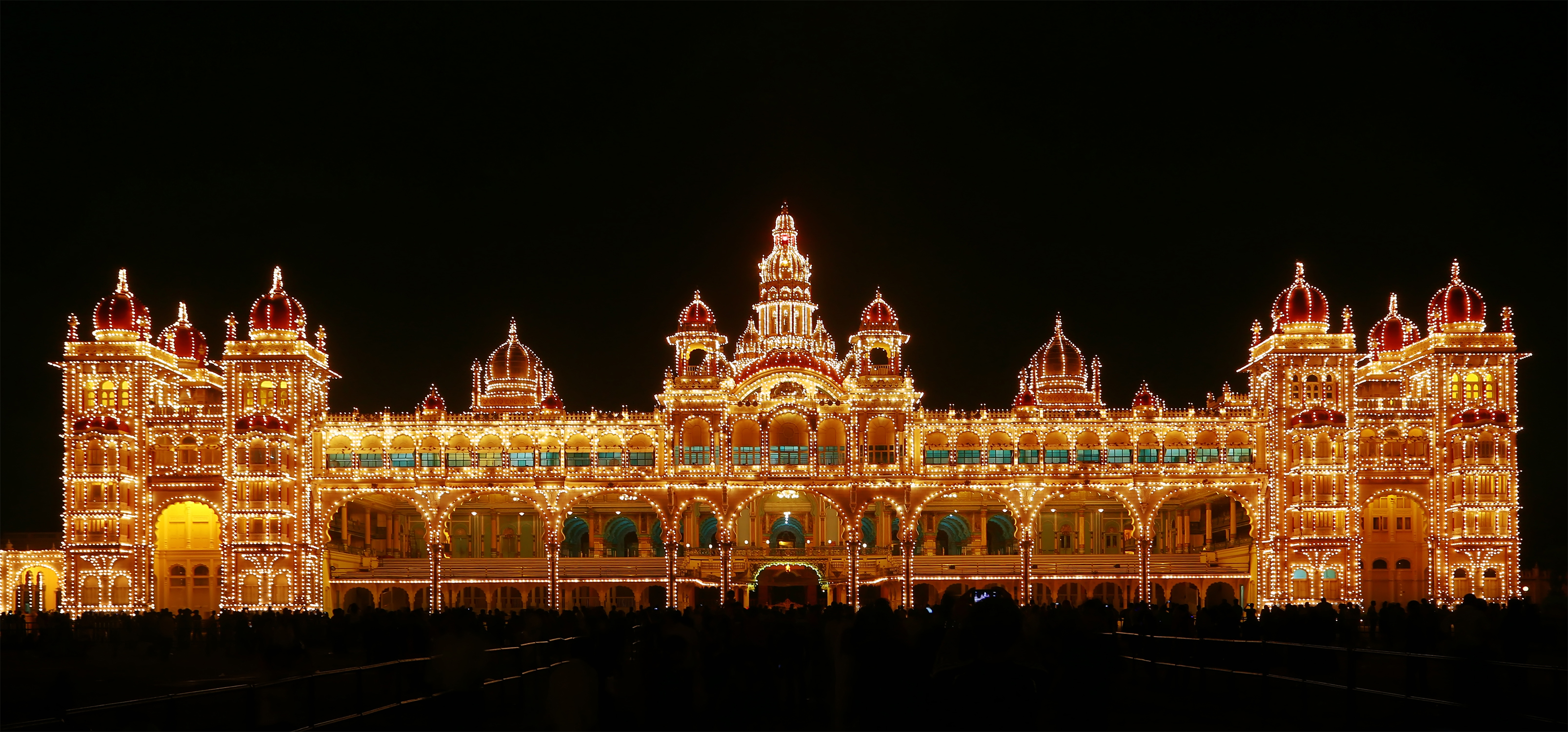
Mysore Palace

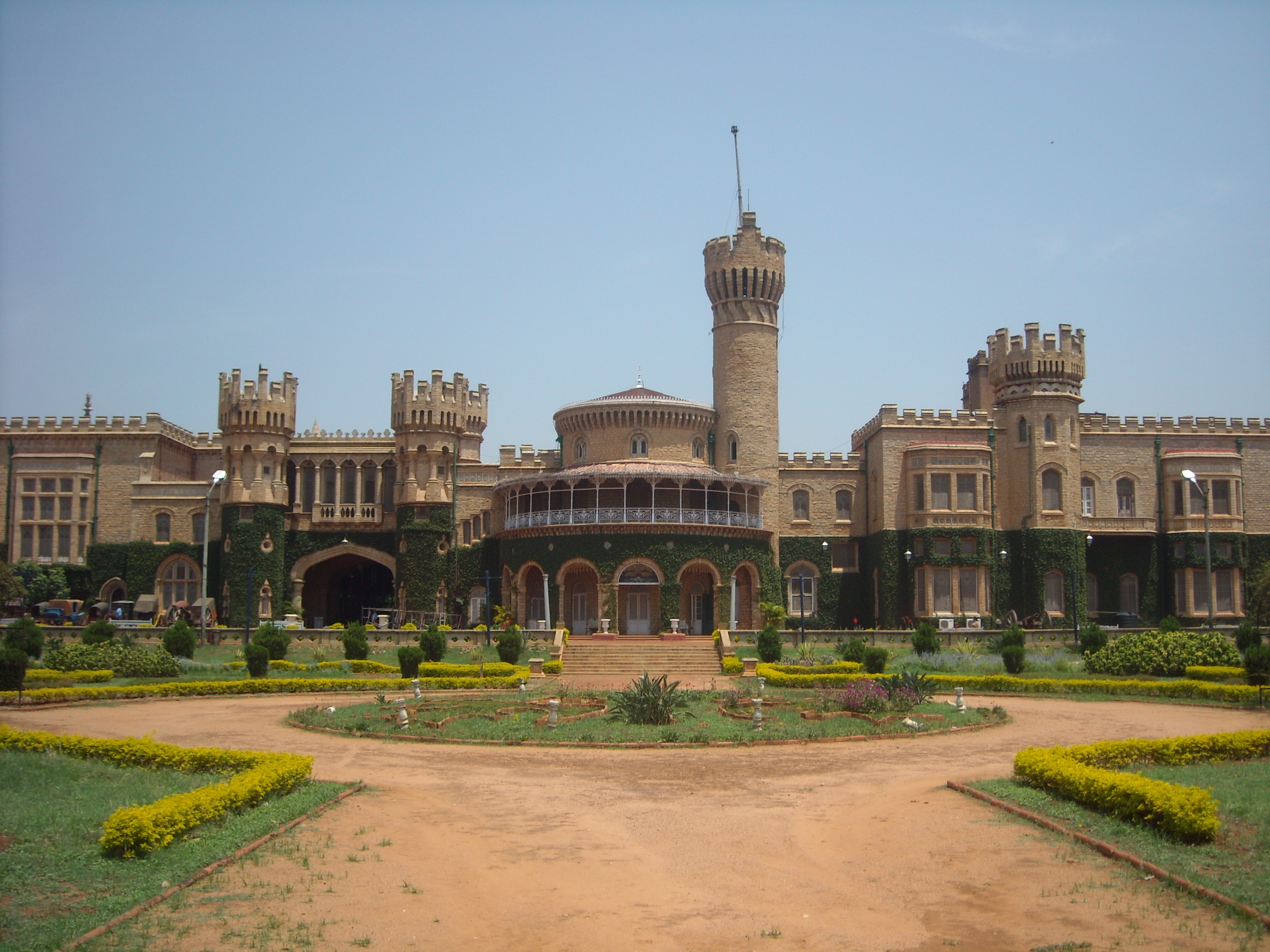
Bangalore Palace

== Kerala ==
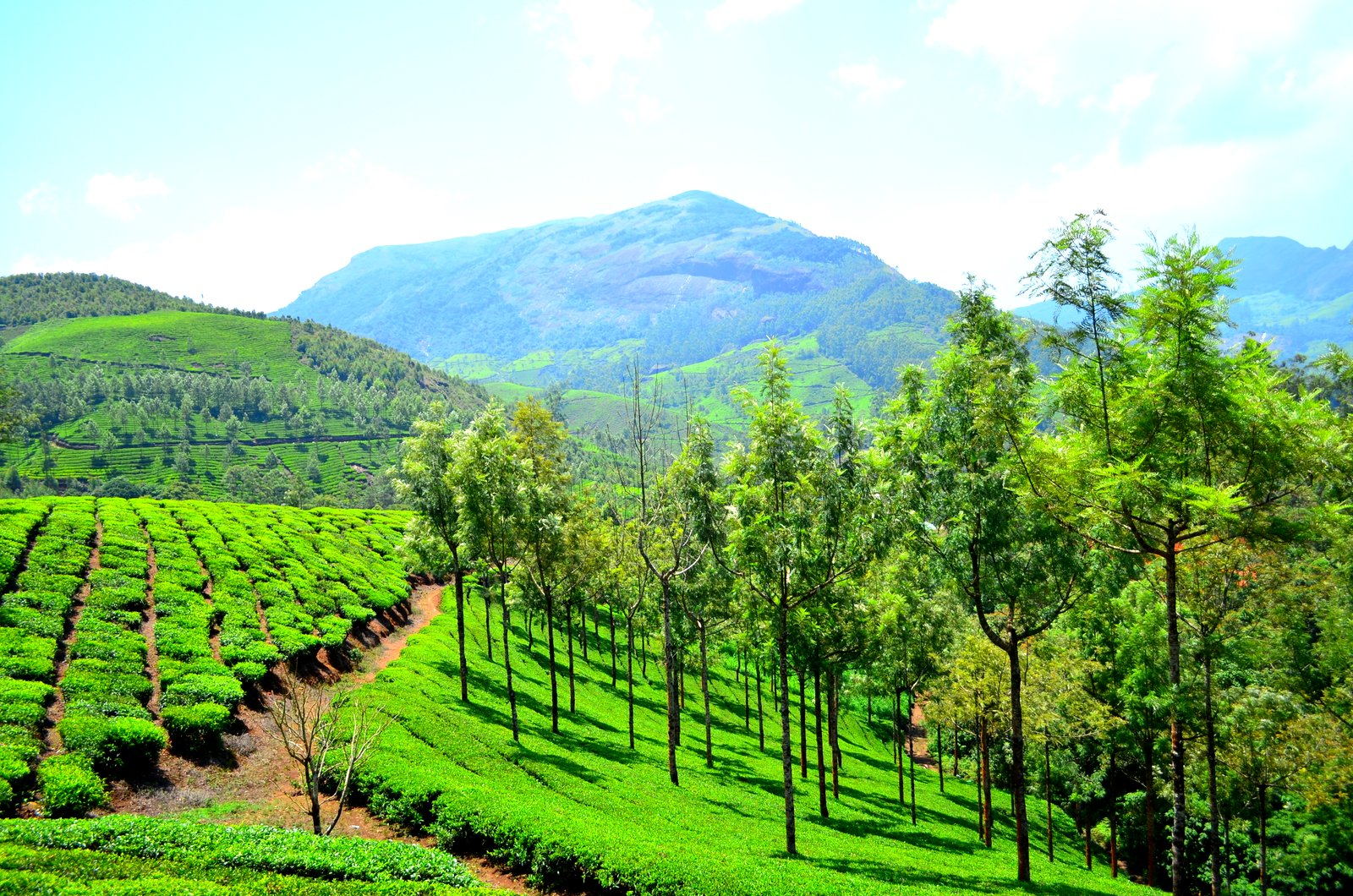
Munnar hill station

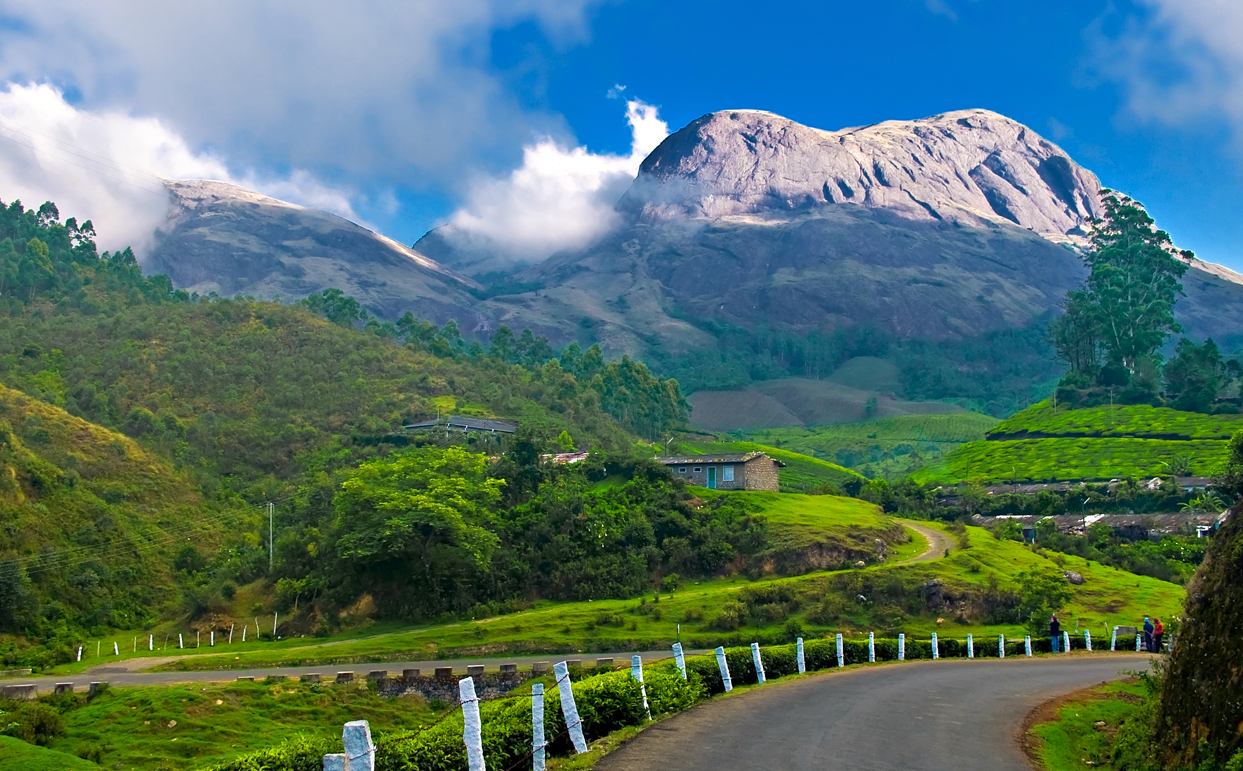
Anamudi peak, Kerala

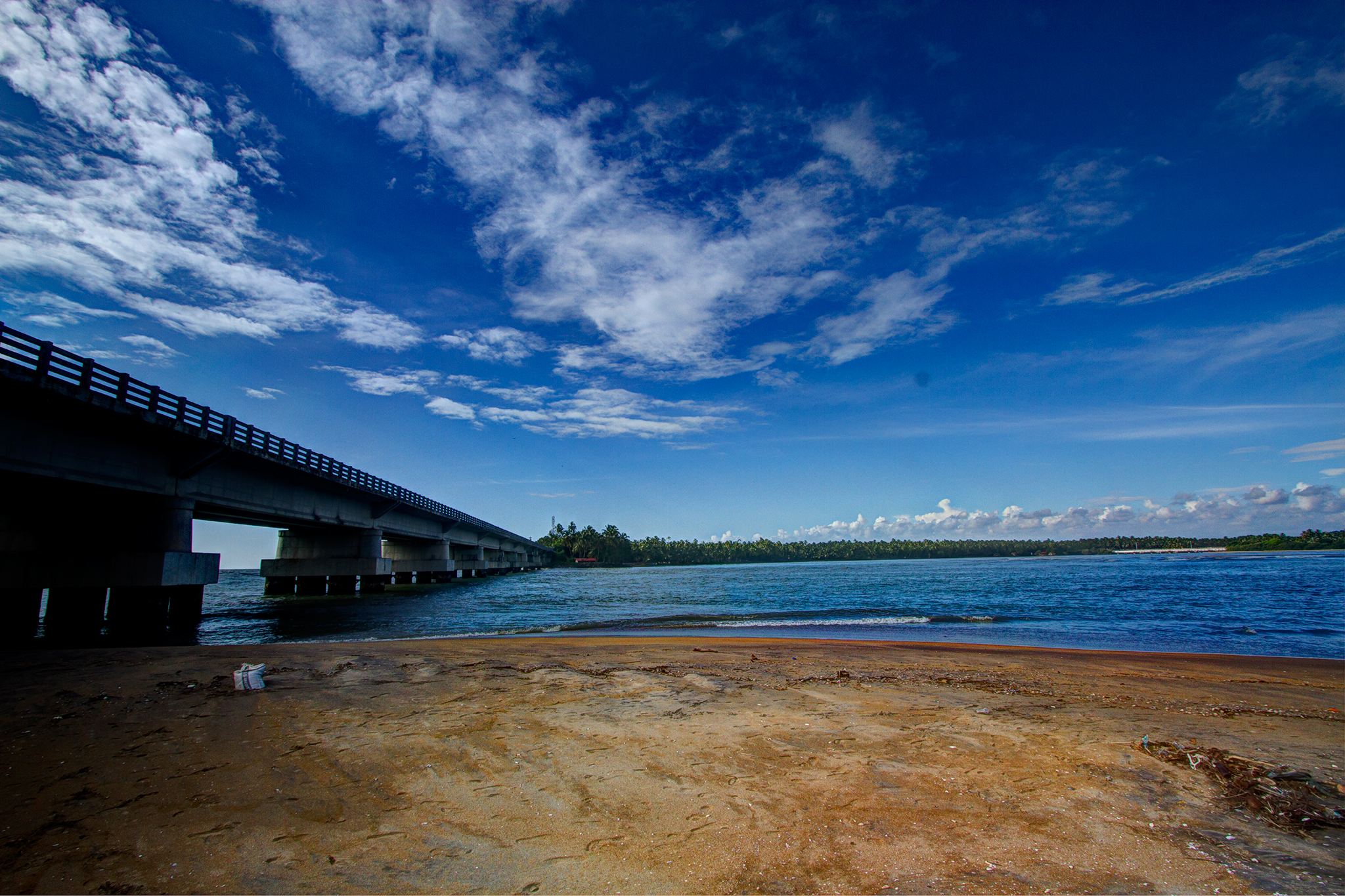
Kadalundi River near Malappuram

Kerala is a state on the tropical Malabar Coast of southwestern India, with tourism promoted around backwaters, beaches, hill stations, wildlife, and cultural heritage. Kerala is marketed as "God's Own Country" by the state's tourism department; policy initiatives include a Responsible Tourism Mission that supports community-based, sustainable tourism.

The state's backwaters form a network of canals, rivers, and lagoons around destinations such as Alappuzha and Kumarakom, while beaches including Kovalam and Varkala draw domestic and international visitors. In the high ranges, Munnar is a noted hill station near protected areas such as Eravikulam National Park and the Periyar Tiger Reserve.

Major attractions include backwater cruises around Alappuzha and Kumarakom; coastal areas such as Fort Kochi, Kovalam, and Varkala; and wildlife viewing, boating, and trekking opportunities in protected landscapes of the Western Ghats. Heritage sites and museums across cities including Thiruvananthapuram and Kochi showcase regional history, architecture, and performance traditions such as Kathakali and Koodiyattam.

The Grand Kerala Shopping Festival is a state-run, December–January retail and cultural programme launched in 2007, held across registered outlets statewide.

== Madhya Pradesh ==
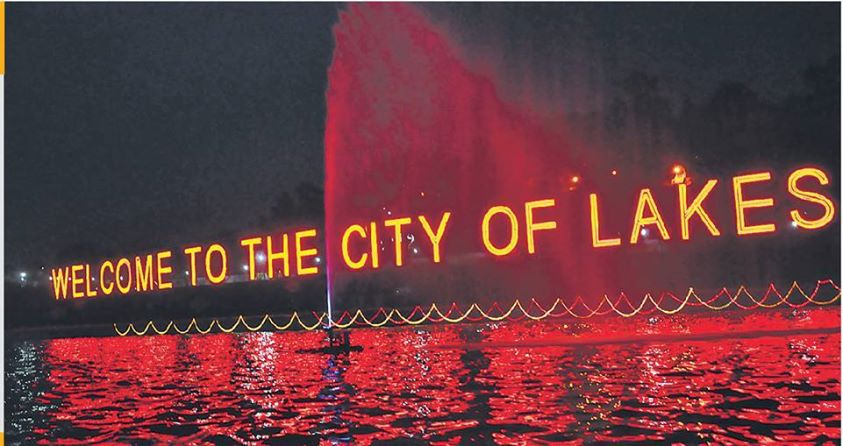
Bhopal is known as City of Lakes with 18 lakes and 6 reservoir

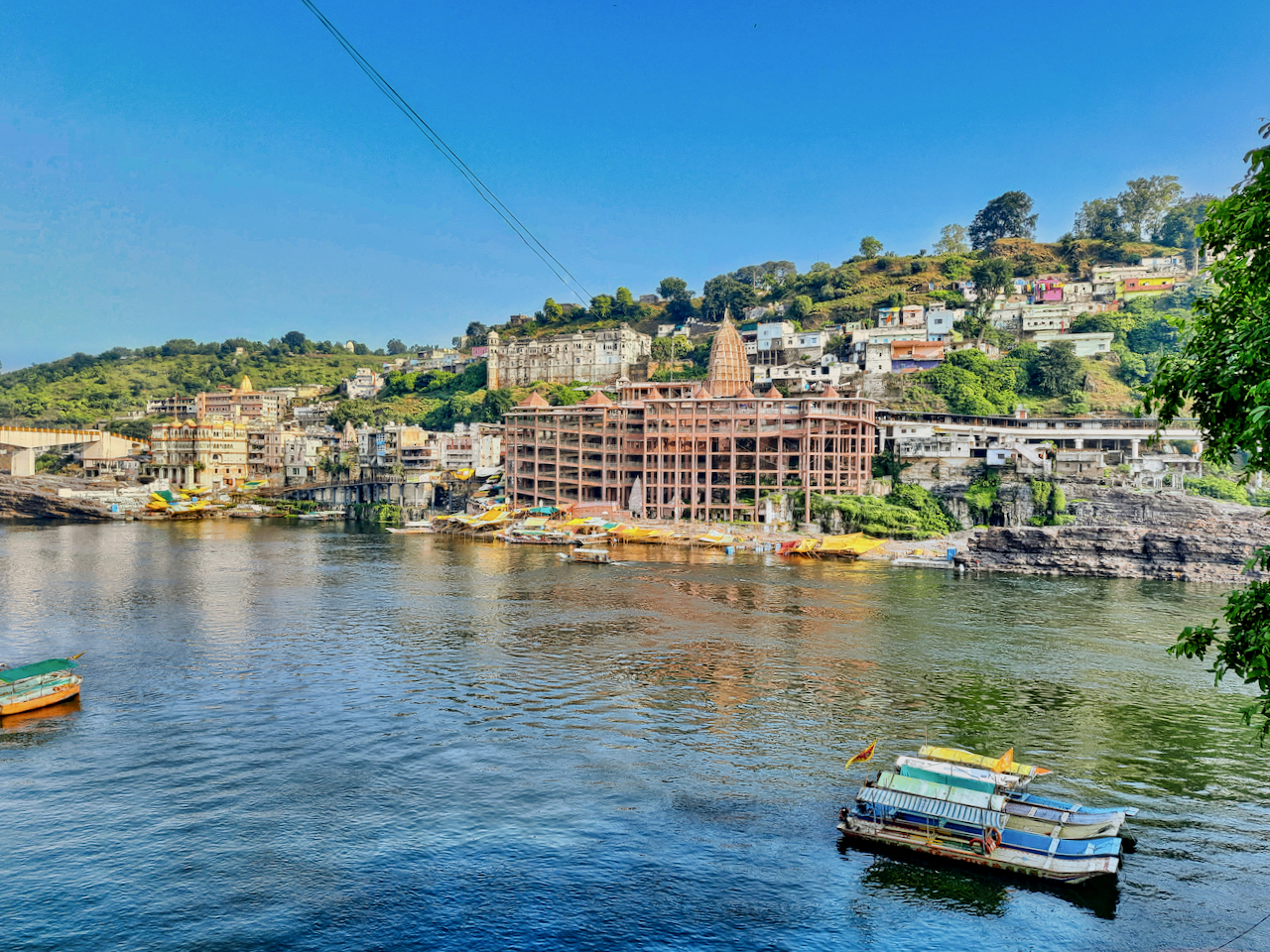
Omkareshwar Temple in Mandhata

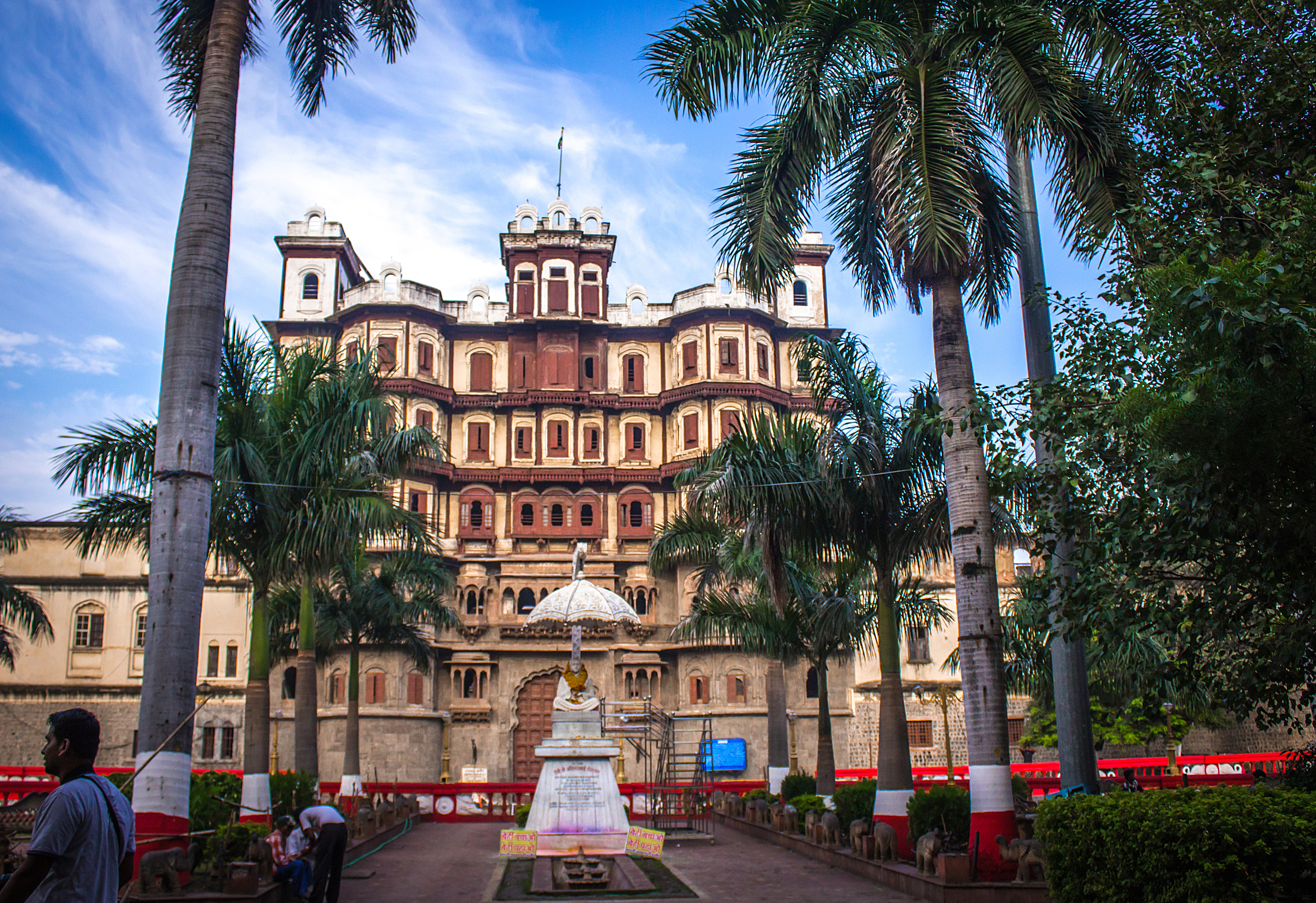
Rajwada Palace in Indore

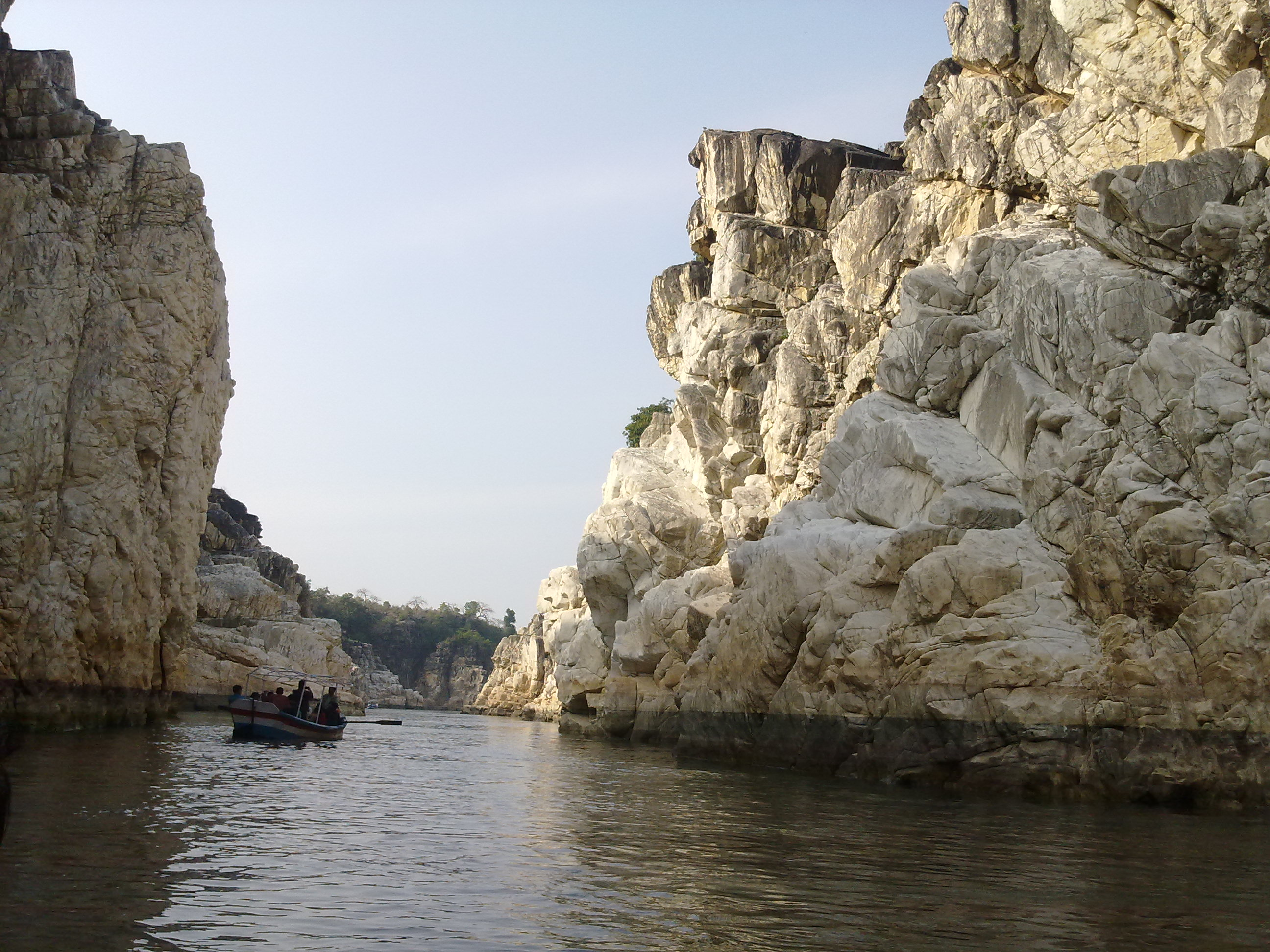
Marble cliffs near Jabalpur

Madhya Pradesh is a central Indian state noted for Mahakal Corridor, Omkareshwar Temple and for three UNESCO World Heritage properties—Khajuraho Group of Monuments, Sanchi, and the Bhimbetka rock shelters—alongside historic cities, river landscapes, and wildlife reserves.

Madhya Pradesh has fastest metropolis cities like Bhopal, Indore etc. which have lot of tourist spots and historical places. Bhopal is popularly knowns as City of Lakes with more than 20 lakes and reservoirs. Indore is known for its rich historical places.

The temples at Khajuraho are known for Nagara‑style architecture and sculptural programs that include erotic imagery; Sanchi preserves a major complex of Buddhist monuments; and Bhimbetka comprises a large concentration of prehistoric rock shelters and paintings.

Wildlife tourism features tiger landscapes and protected areas in the Satpura and Vindhyan ranges, including Kanha Tiger Reserve and Bandhavgarh Tiger Reserve.

As part of Project Cheetah, eight cheetahs from Namibia (September 2022) and a further twelve from South Africa (February 2023) were translocated to Kuno National Park in Sheopur district.

Scenic river landscapes include the marble gorge at Bhedaghat near Jabalpur, part of the Bhedaghat–Lametaghāt entry on India's Tentative List for World Heritage.

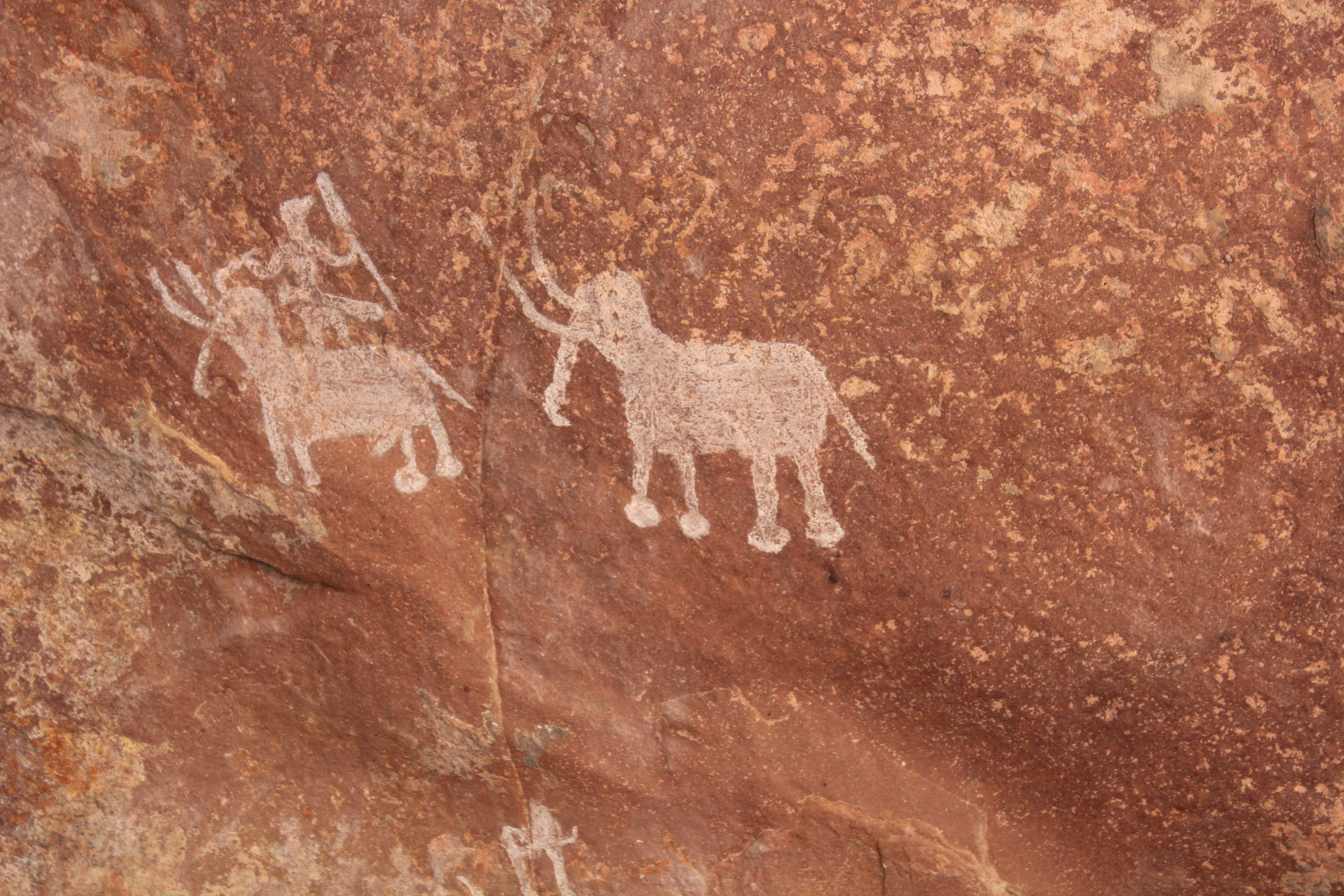
Bhimbetka Caves

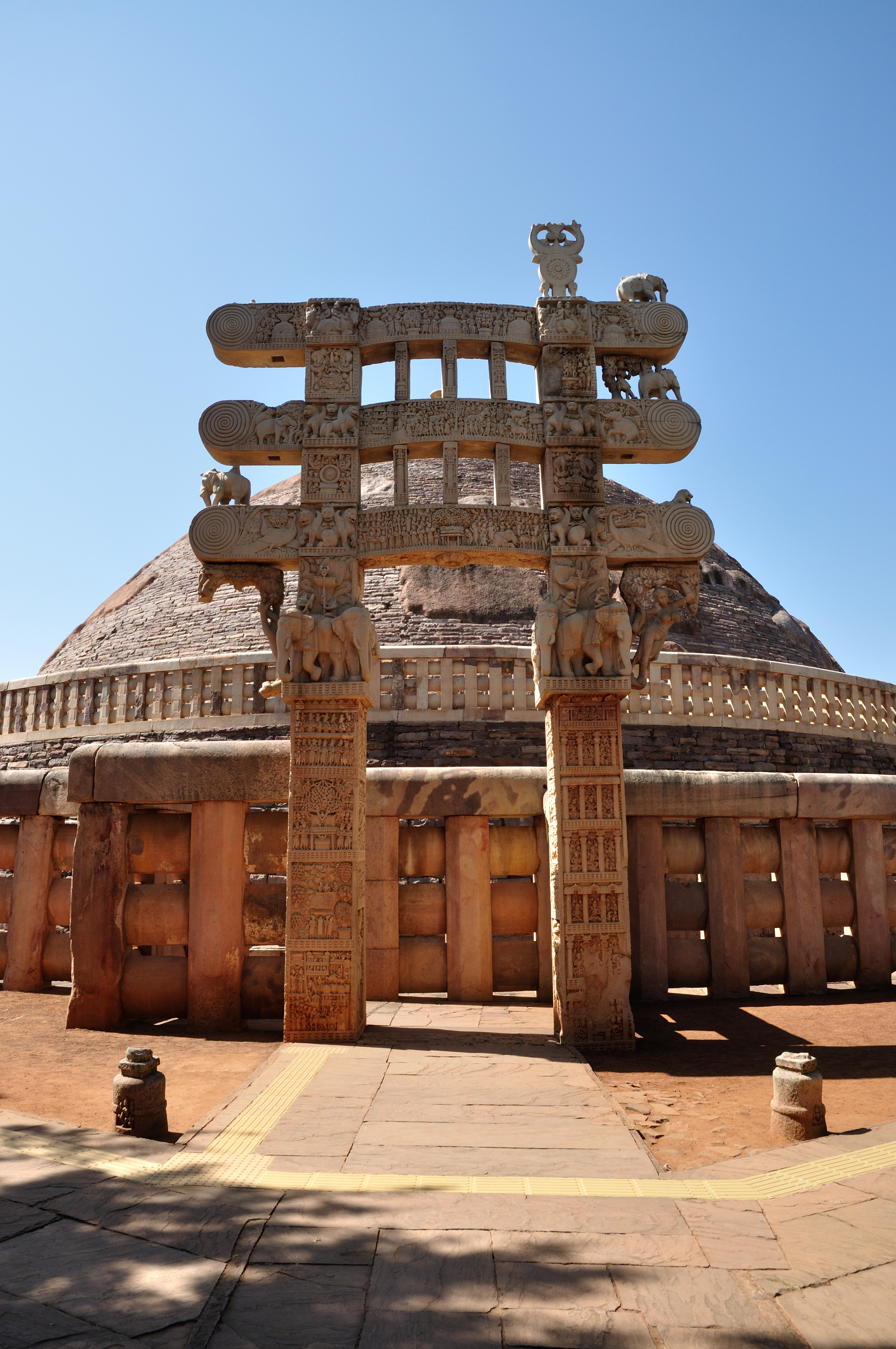
Sanchi Stupa

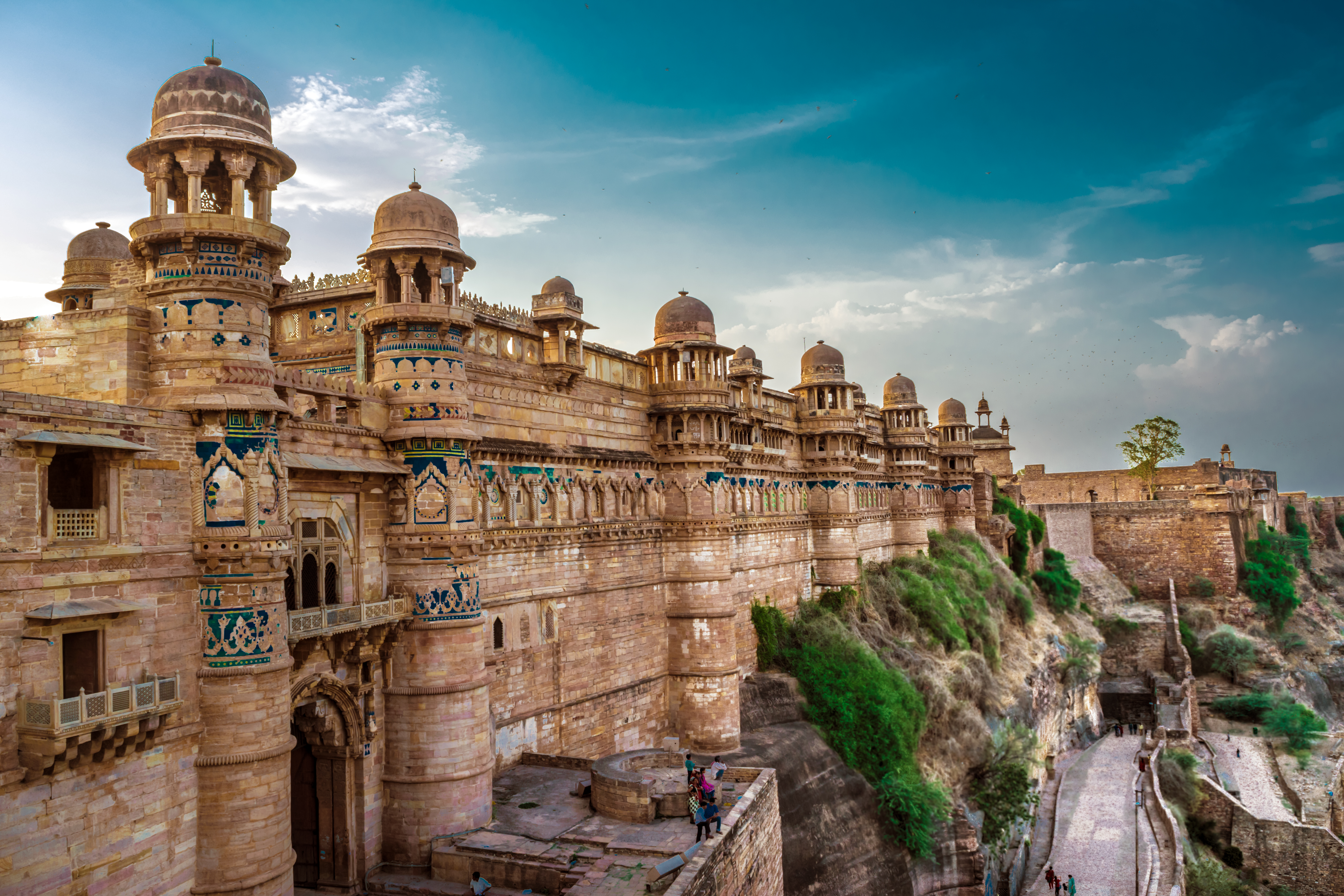
Gwalior

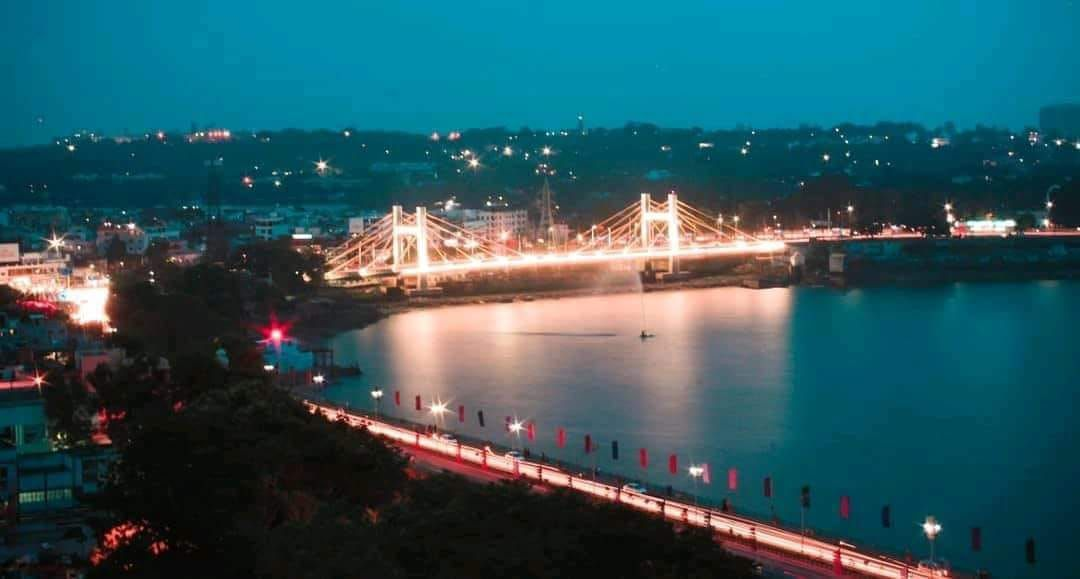
Raja Bhoj Setu

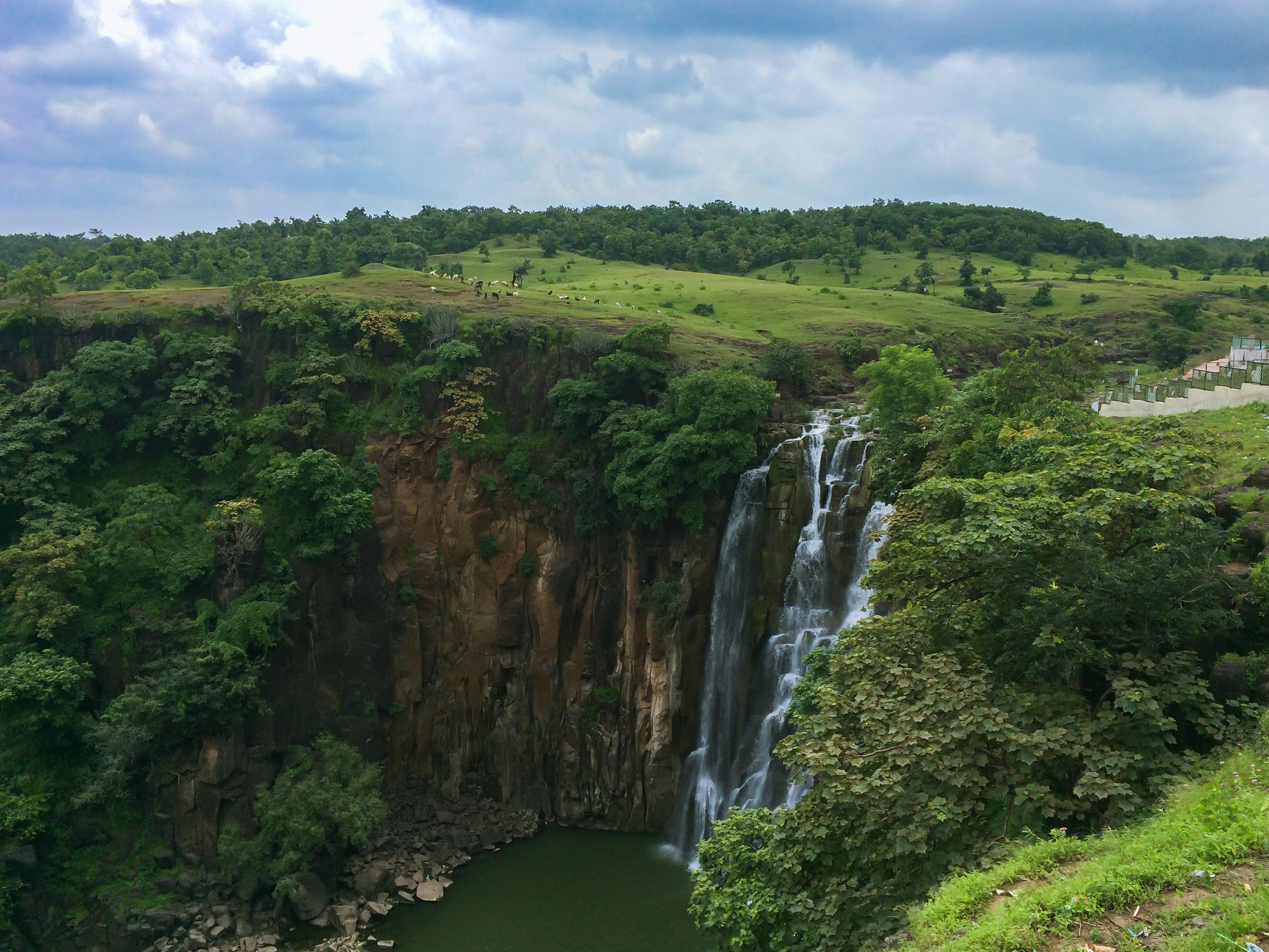
Patalpani waterfall

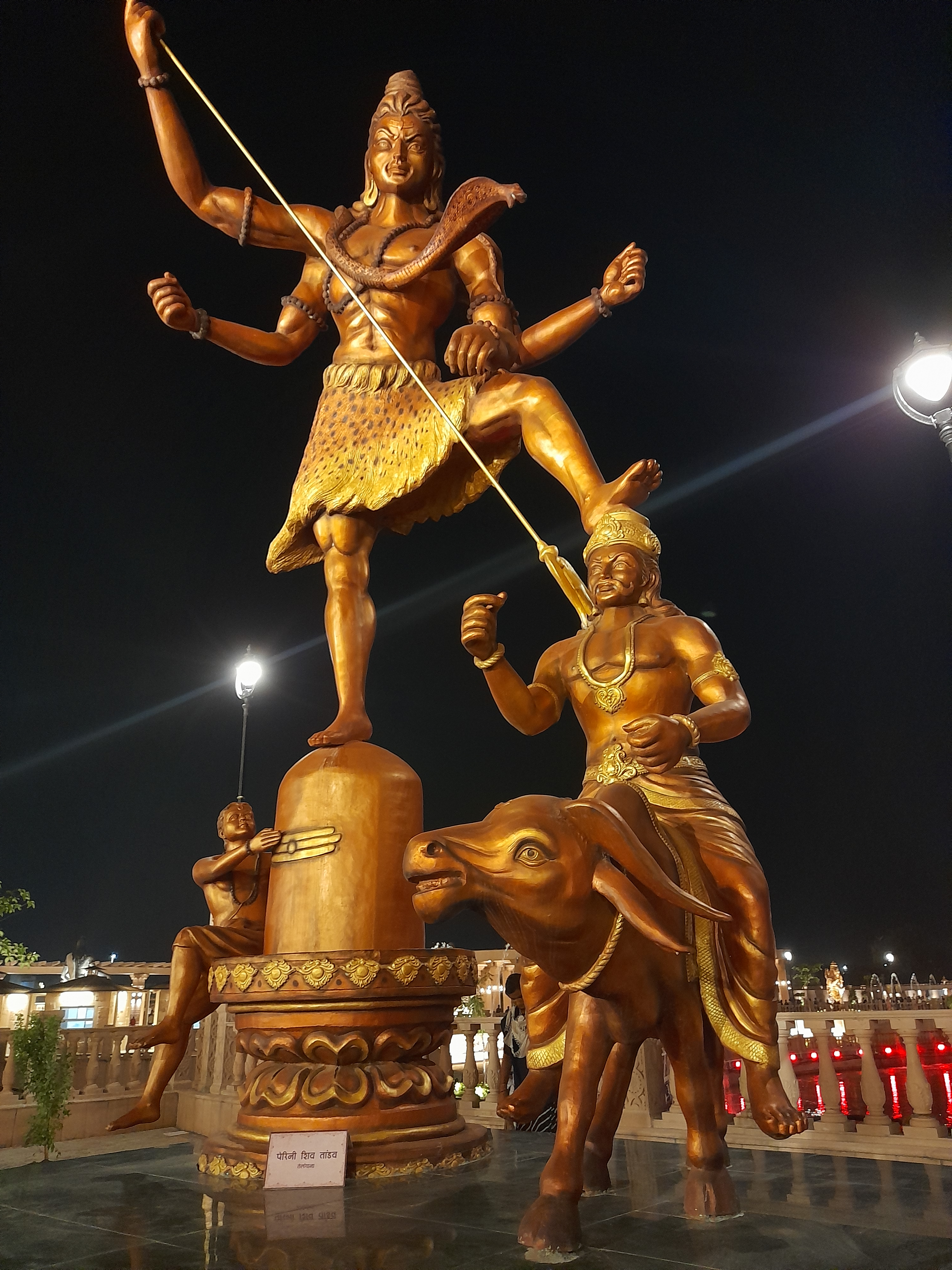
Mahakal Corridor

== Maharashtra ==
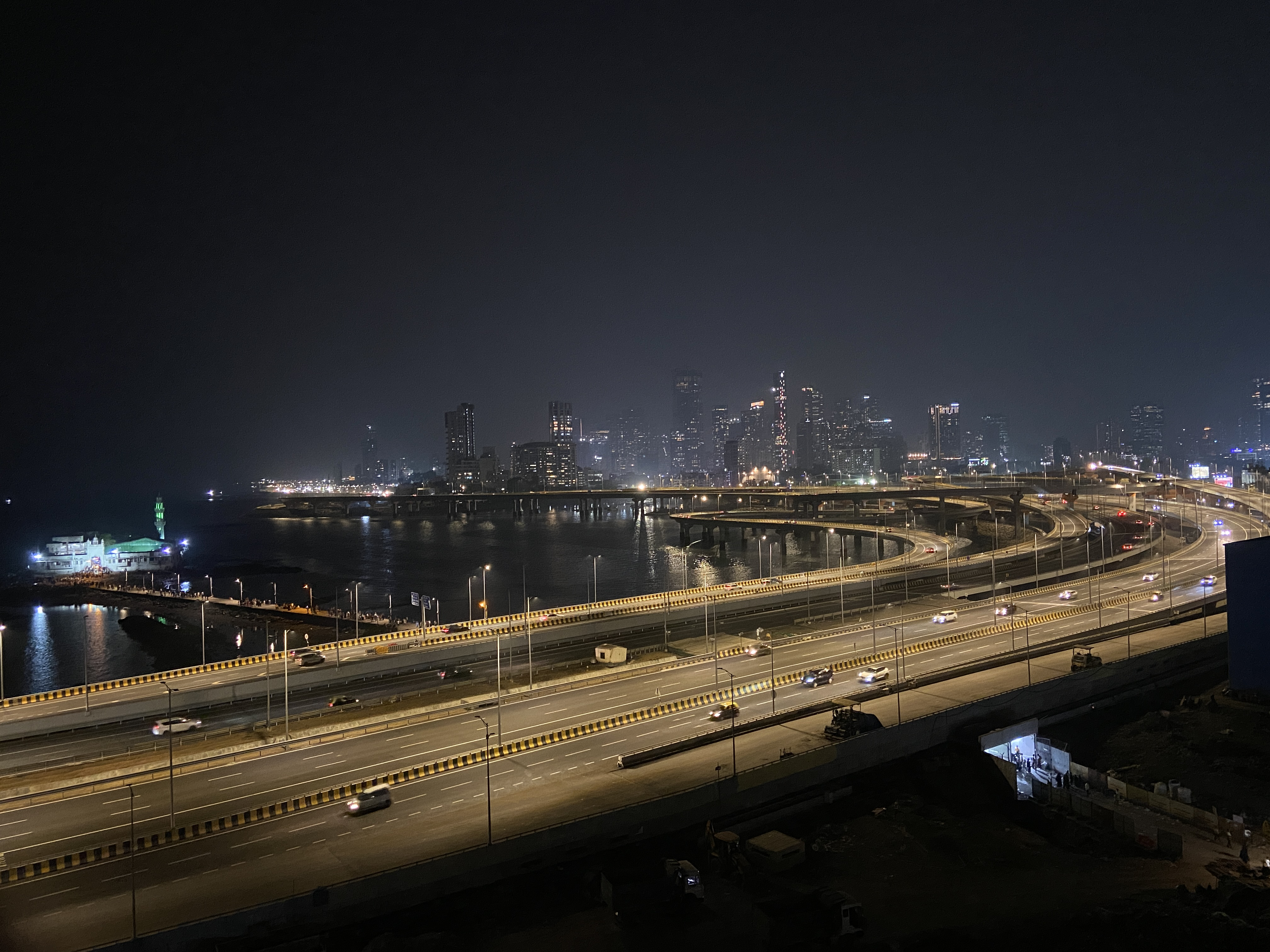
Mumbai’s coastal road and cityscape

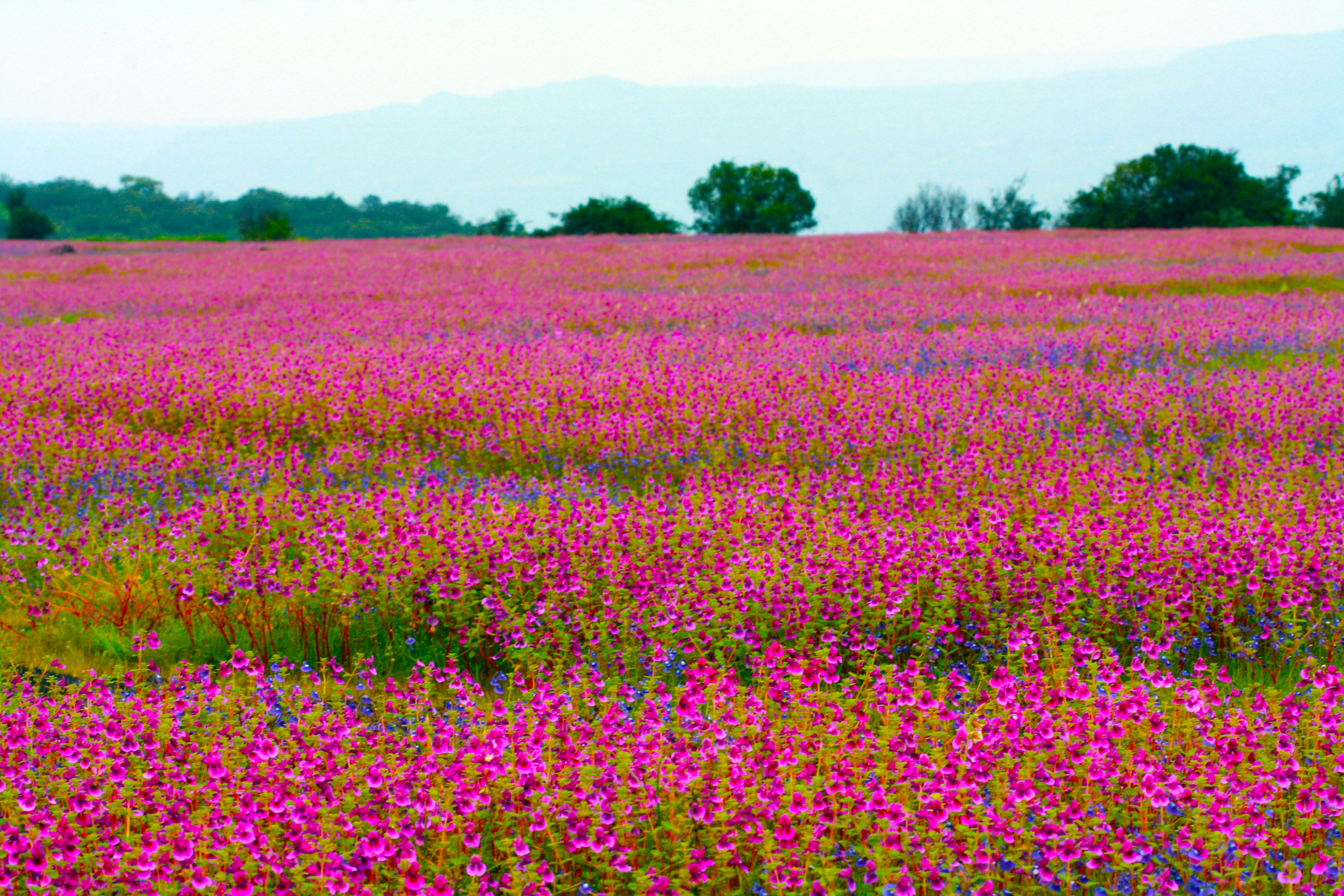
Kaas Plateau, part of the Western Ghats World Heritage property

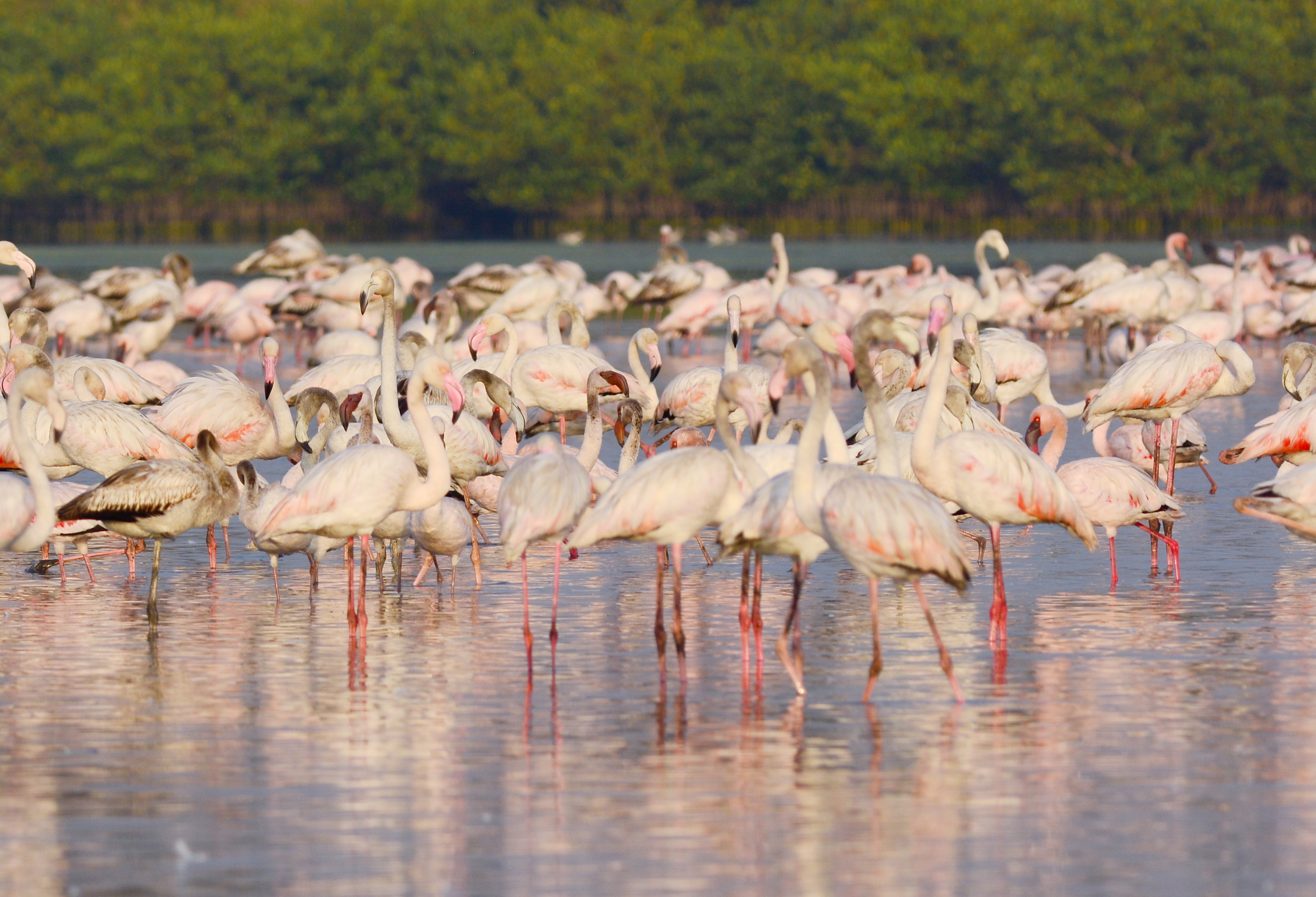
Flamingos at Navi Mumbai, a designated Ramsar wetland in the Mumbai Metropolitan Region

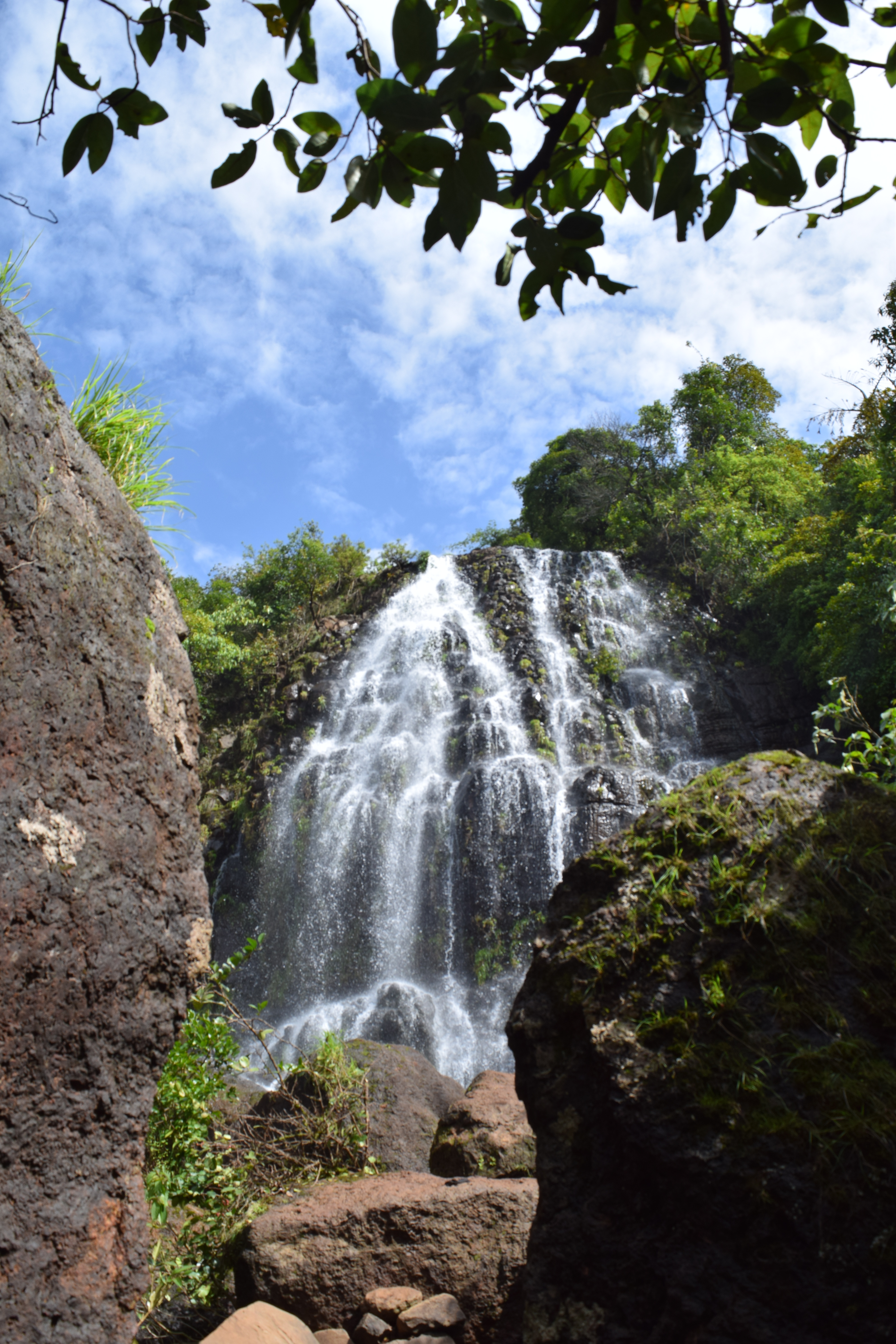
Ekiv waterfall in Satara

Maharashtra features a mix of cultural heritage and coastal–Western Ghats landscapes, including four UNESCO World Heritage properties: the Ajanta Caves, Ellora Caves, Elephanta Caves, and Chhatrapati Shivaji Maharaj Terminus (CSMT) in Mumbai.

In Mumbai, colonial-era architecture such as CSMT stands alongside modern urban development, while offshore the Elephanta cave temples preserve mid‑1st‑millennium rock‑cut art dedicated chiefly to Shiva. In the Deccan, the mural‑rich Buddhist monastic complex at Ajanta and the multi‑faith rock‑cut ensemble at Ellora are key heritage destinations.

Natural attractions include portions of the UNESCO‑inscribed Western Ghats serial property, with seasonal lateritic plateaus such as Kaas noted for wildflower blooms and endemic biodiversity. The urban wetland of Thane Creek (Mumbai Metropolitan Region) is a Ramsar site that supports large congregations of flamingos and other waterbirds.

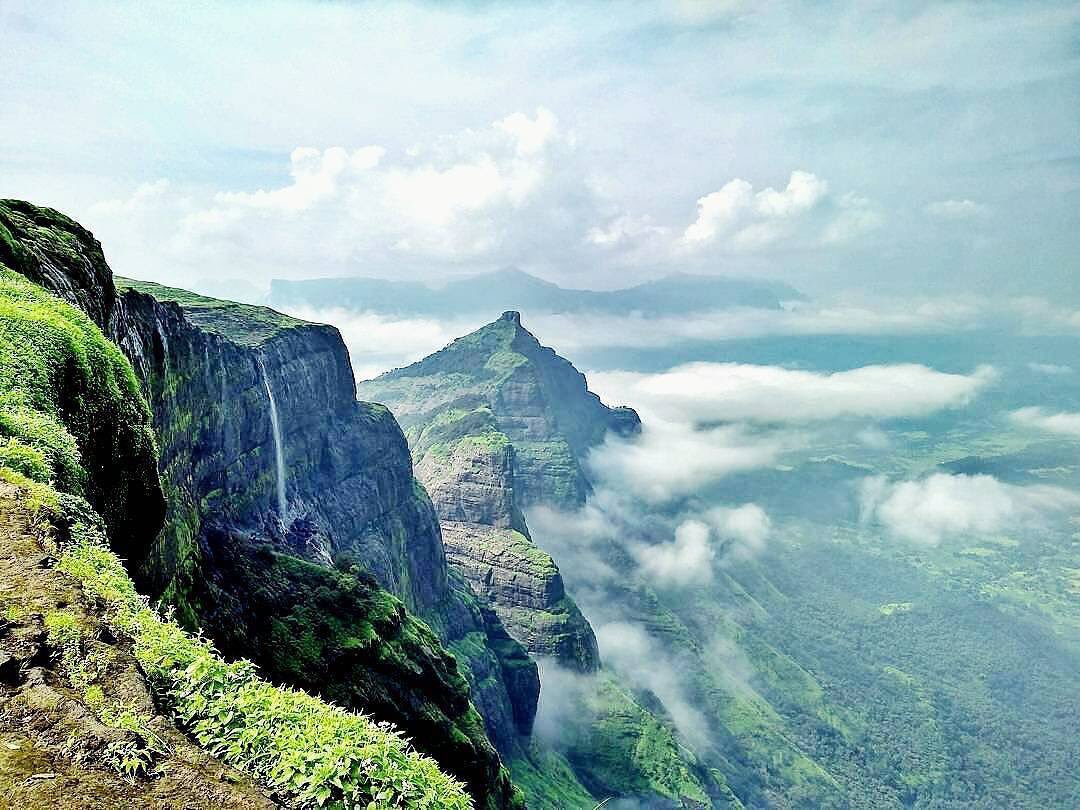
Maratha Military Landscapes of India, or Forts of Maharashtra

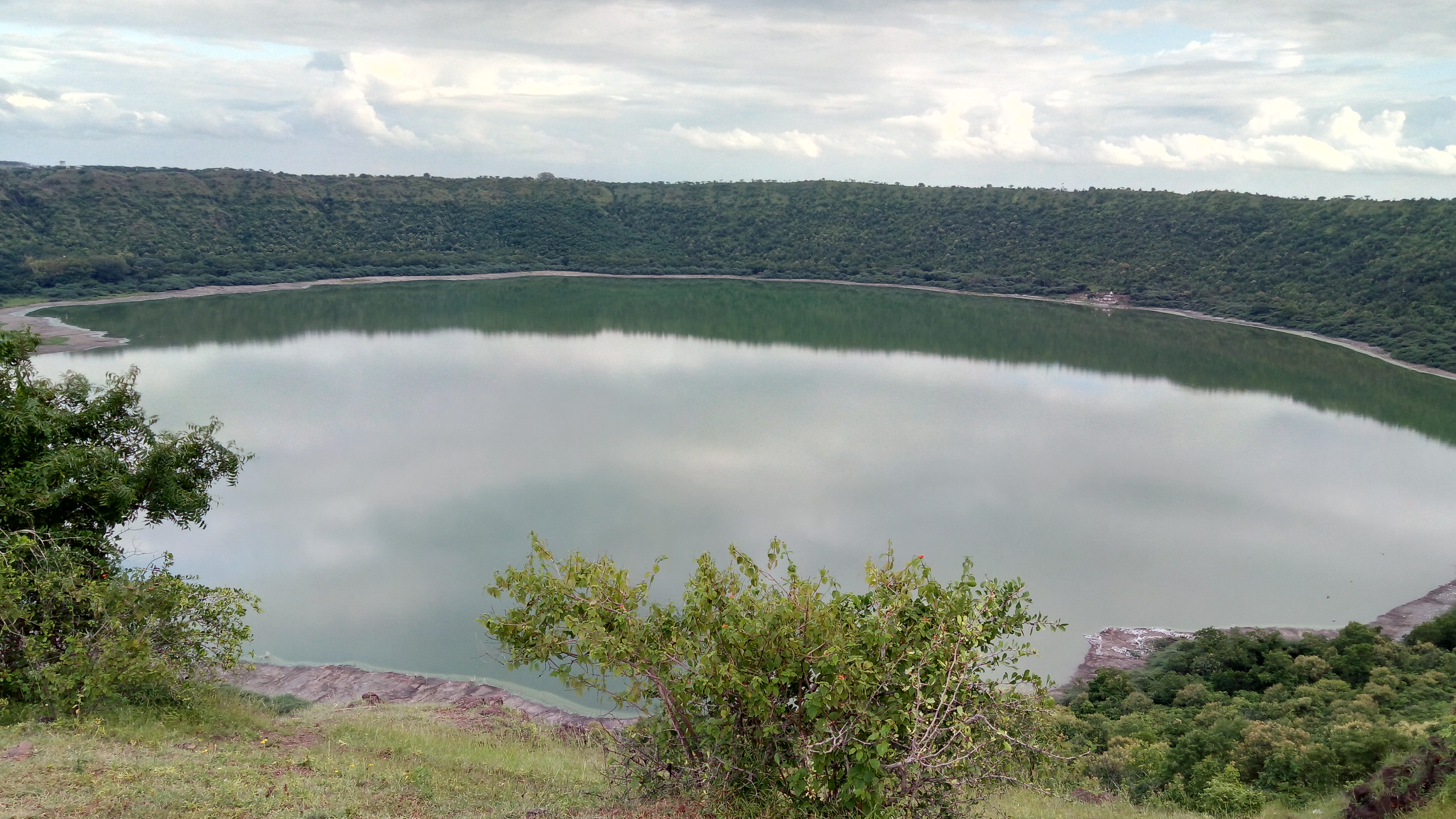
Lonar Lake

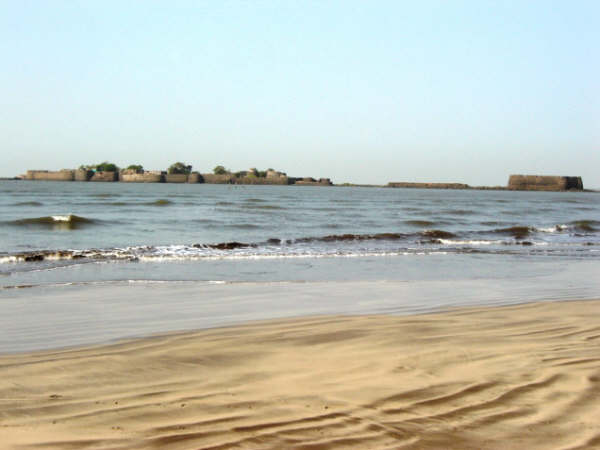
Alibag beach

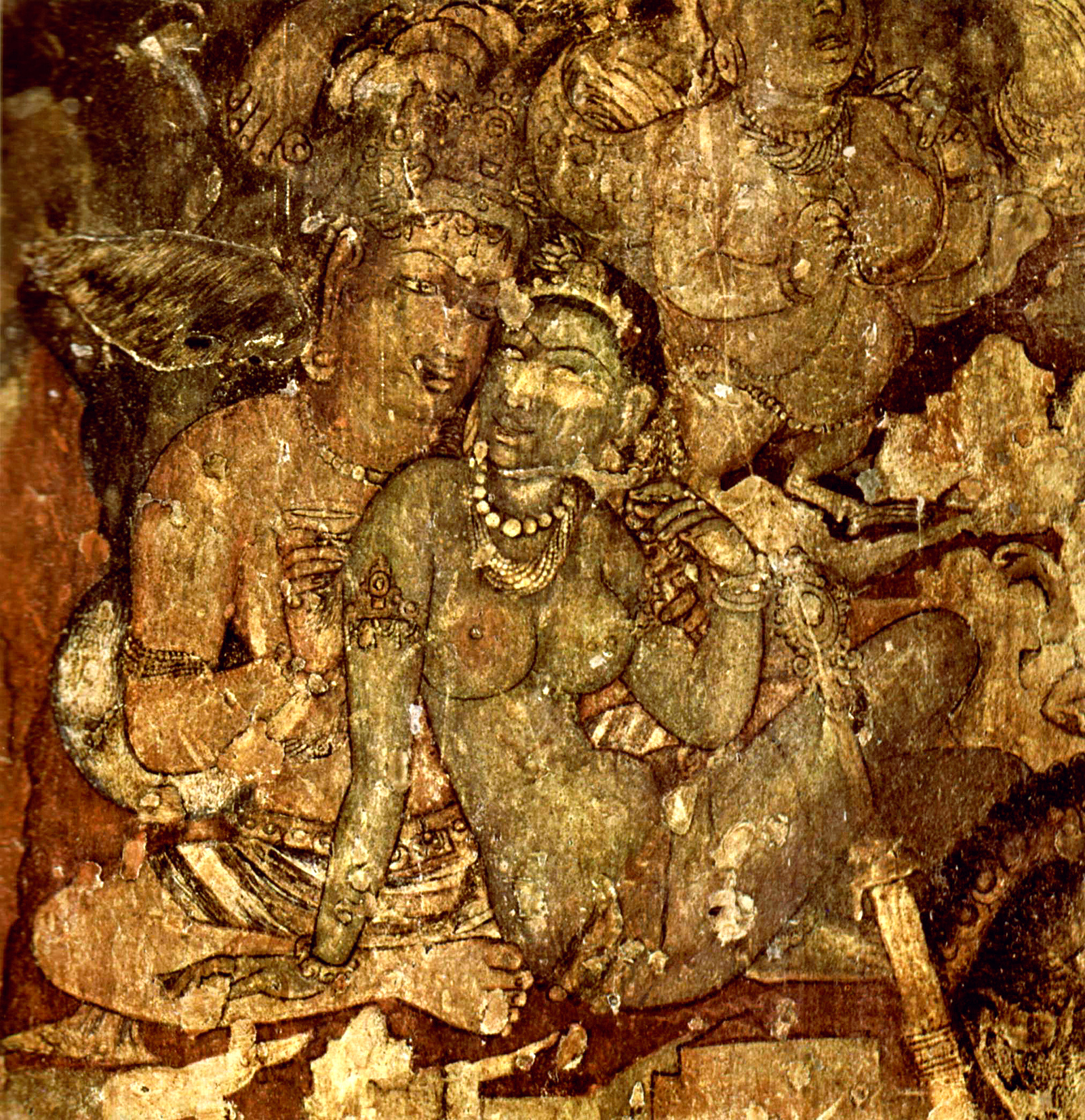
Ajanta Caves murals (UNESCO World Heritage Site)

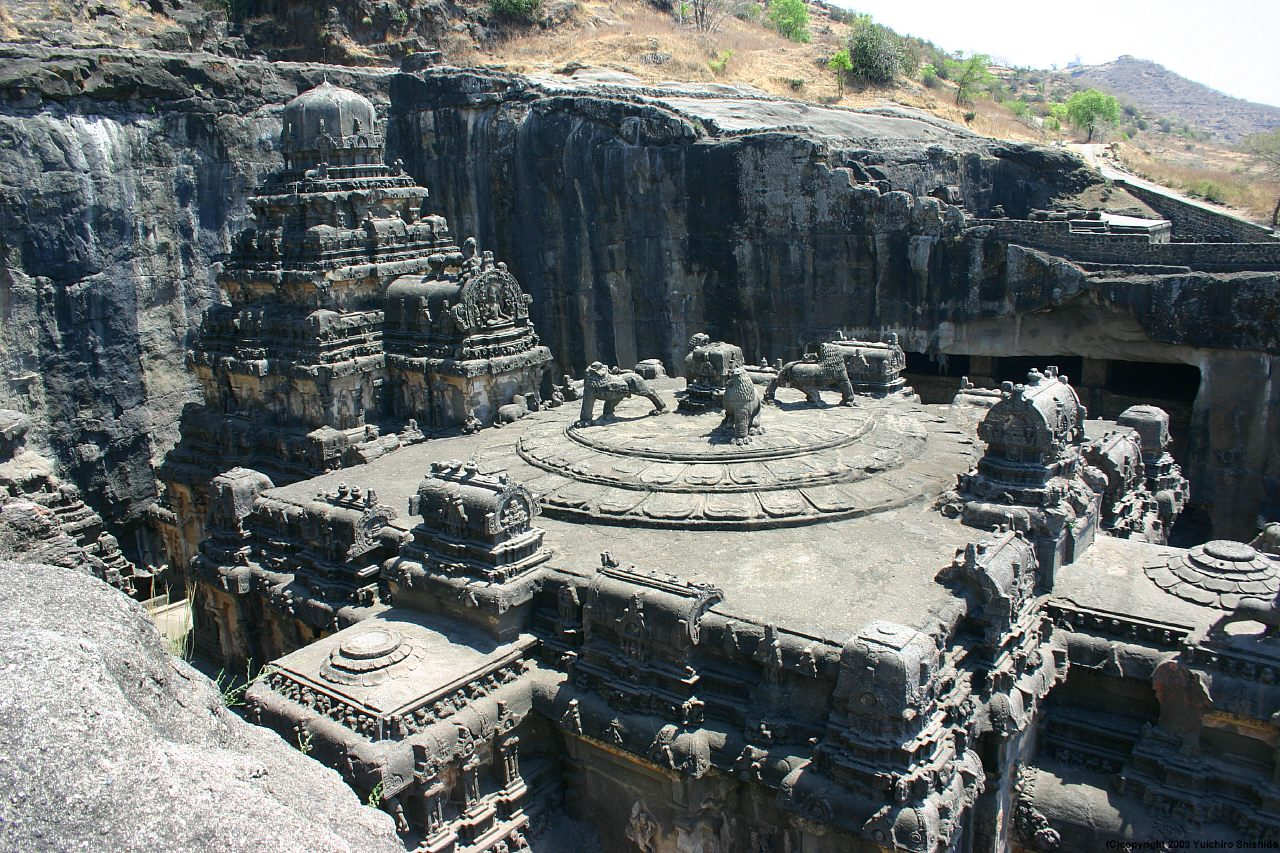
Kailasa Temple at Ellora (UNESCO World Heritage Site)

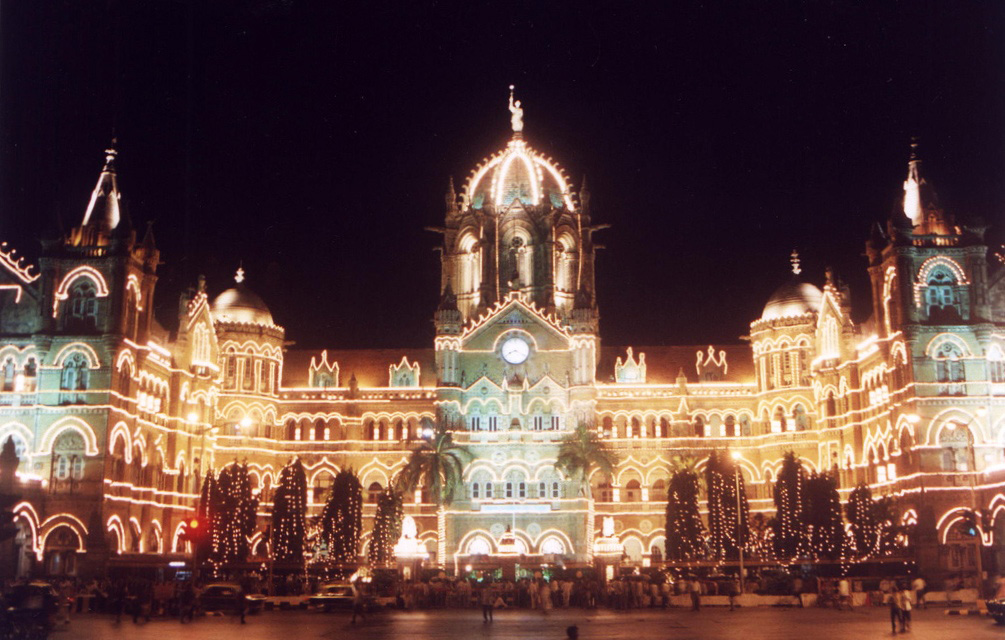
Chhatrapati Shivaji Terminus (UNESCO World Heritage Site)

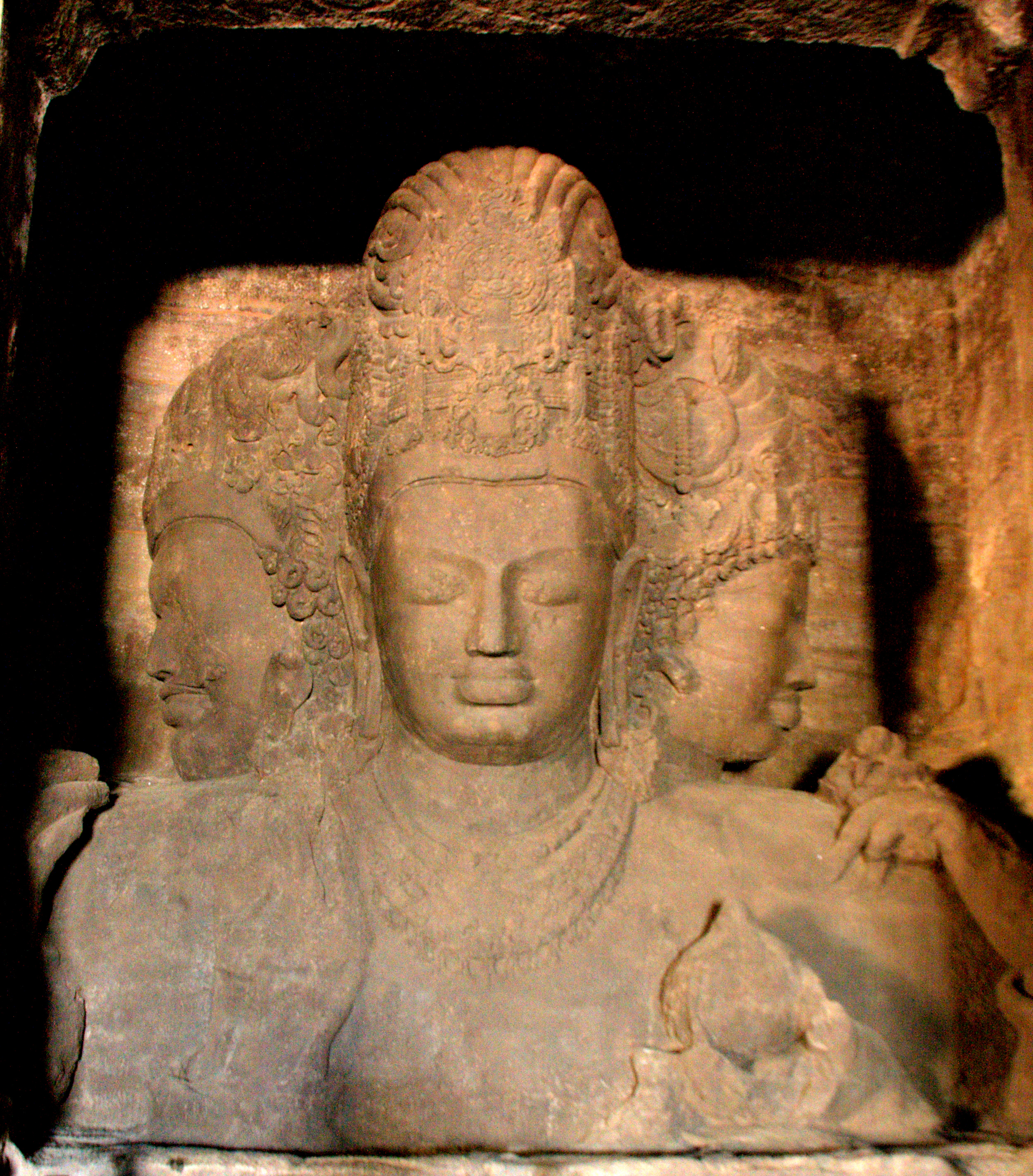
Trimurti relief in Elephanta Caves (UNESCO World Heritage Site)

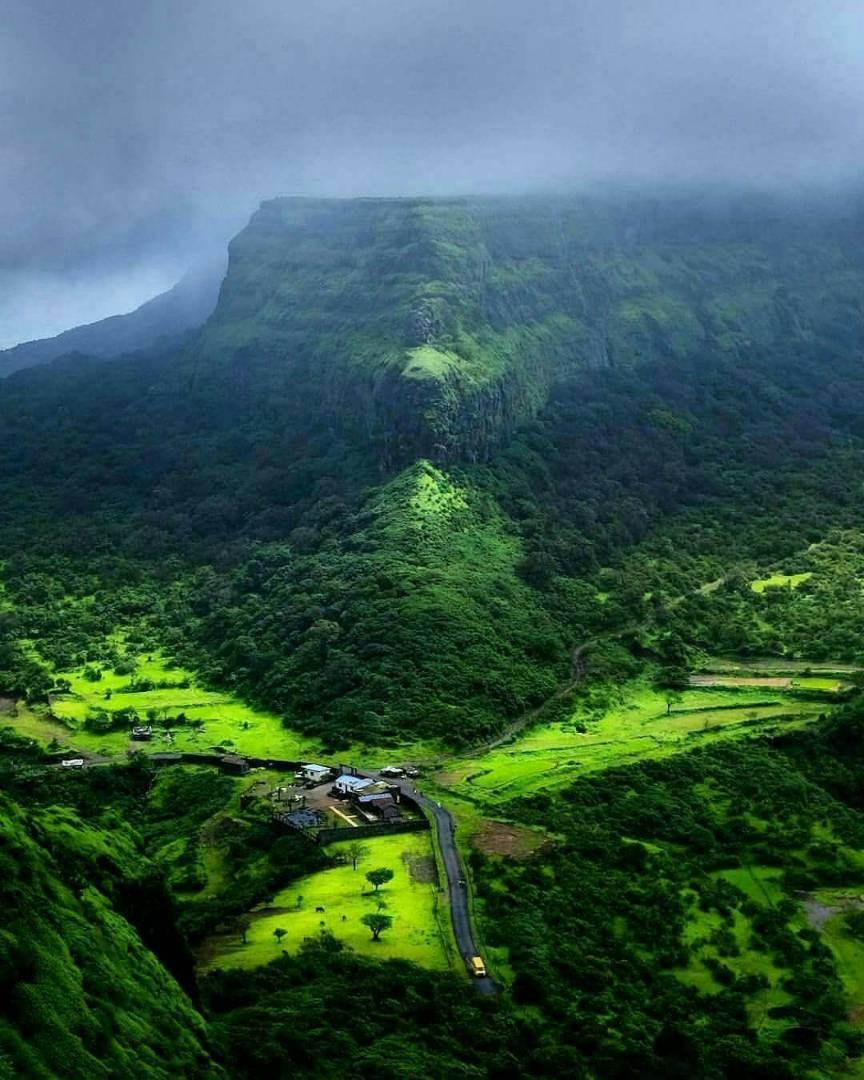
Western Ghats in Maharashtra (part of UNESCO serial property)

== Manipur ==
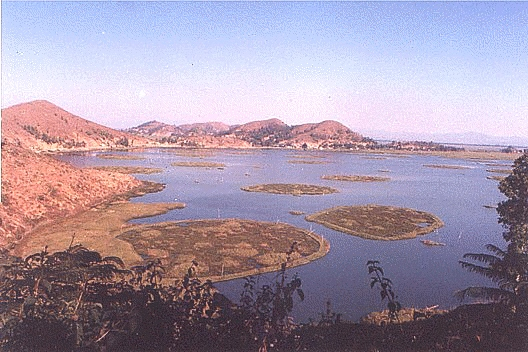
Loktak Lake

Manipur is a state in Northeast India known for wetland landscapes, highland biodiversity, and cultural festivals centered on sites such as Loktak Lake and the surrounding protected areas. Loktak is a designated Ramsar wetland notable for floating vegetated islands (phumdi) and forms part of a wider wetland complex managed for conservation and livelihoods.

The adjacent Keibul Lamjao National Park—described as the world's only floating national park—provides habitat for the endemic brow‑antlered deer known locally as the sangai. In the Ukhrul highlands, the state‑level Shirui Lily Festival highlights conservation of the endemic Shirui lily (Lilium mackliniae).

Selected places: - Imphal — Capital city with World War II memorial sites including the Imphal War Cemetery maintained by the Commonwealth War Graves Commission. - Keibul Lamjao National Park — Floating phumdi meadows on Loktak Lake noted for the sangai deer and wetland biodiversity. - Loktak Lake — Ramsar site supporting waterbirds and traditional fisheries; part of the broader Loktak wetland complex. - Moreh — Border trade town on the India–Myanmar corridor in Tengnoupal district.

== Meghalaya ==
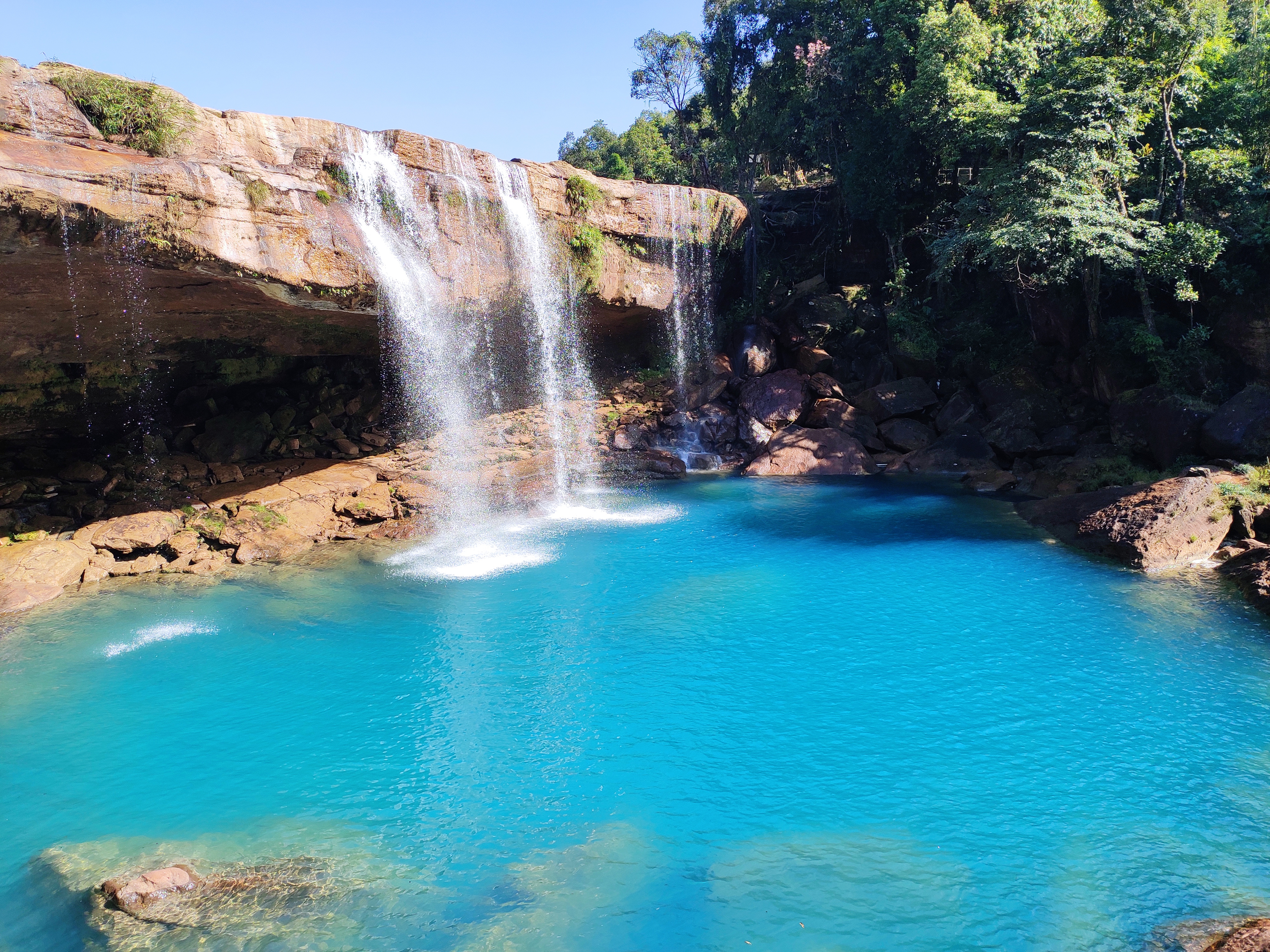
Krang Suri Waterfalls

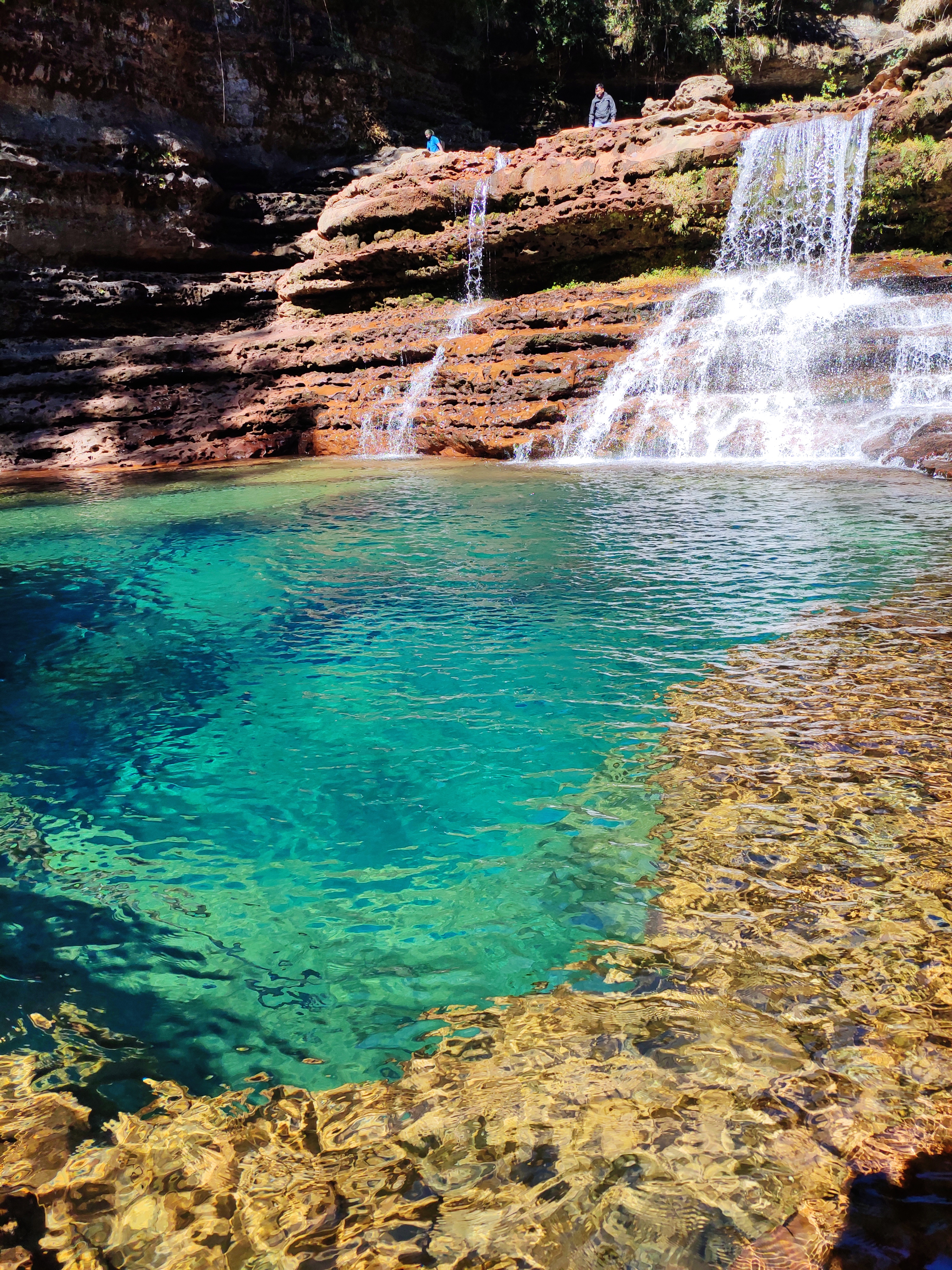
Wei Sawdong Falls

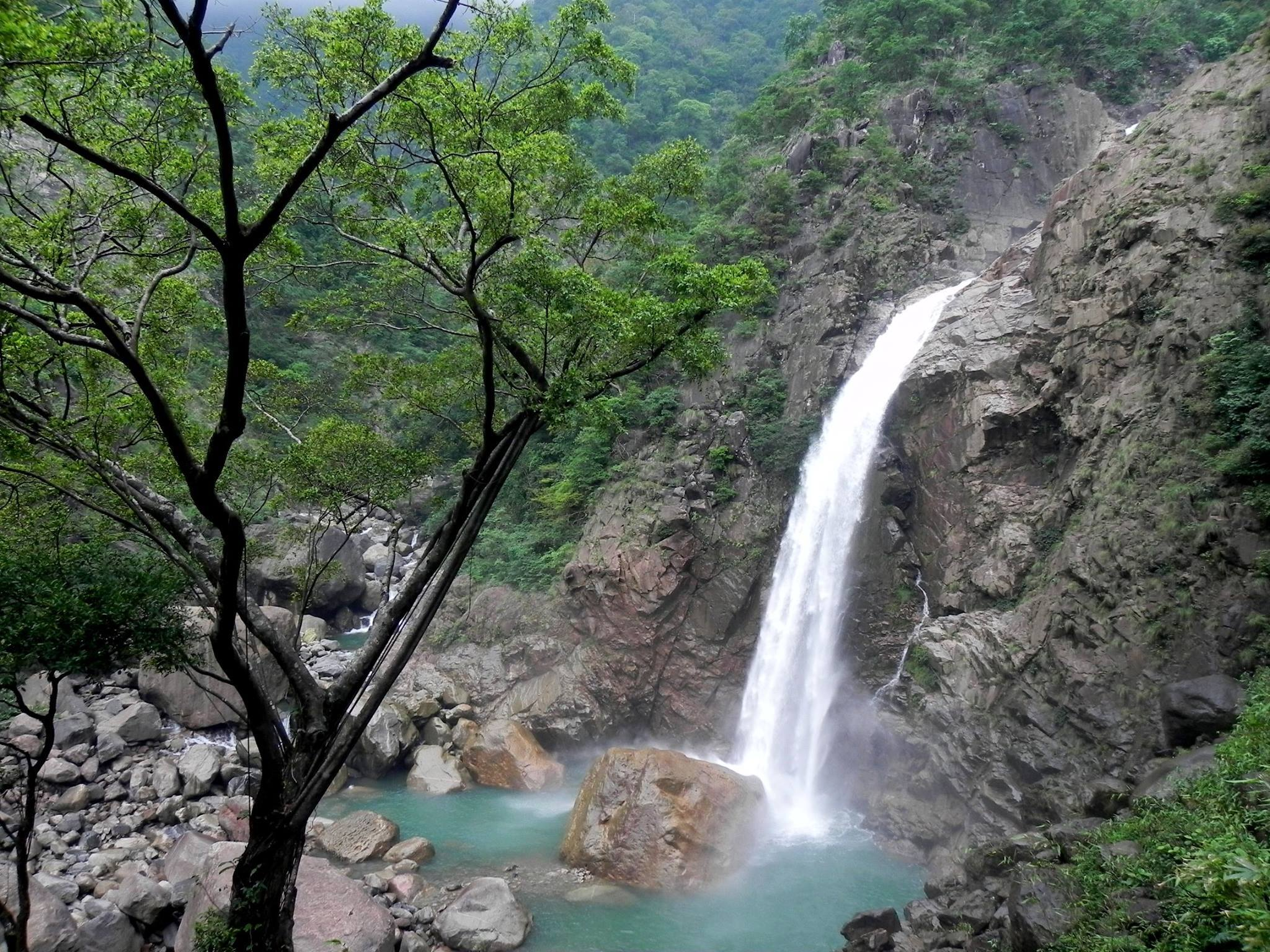
Rainbow Waterfalls

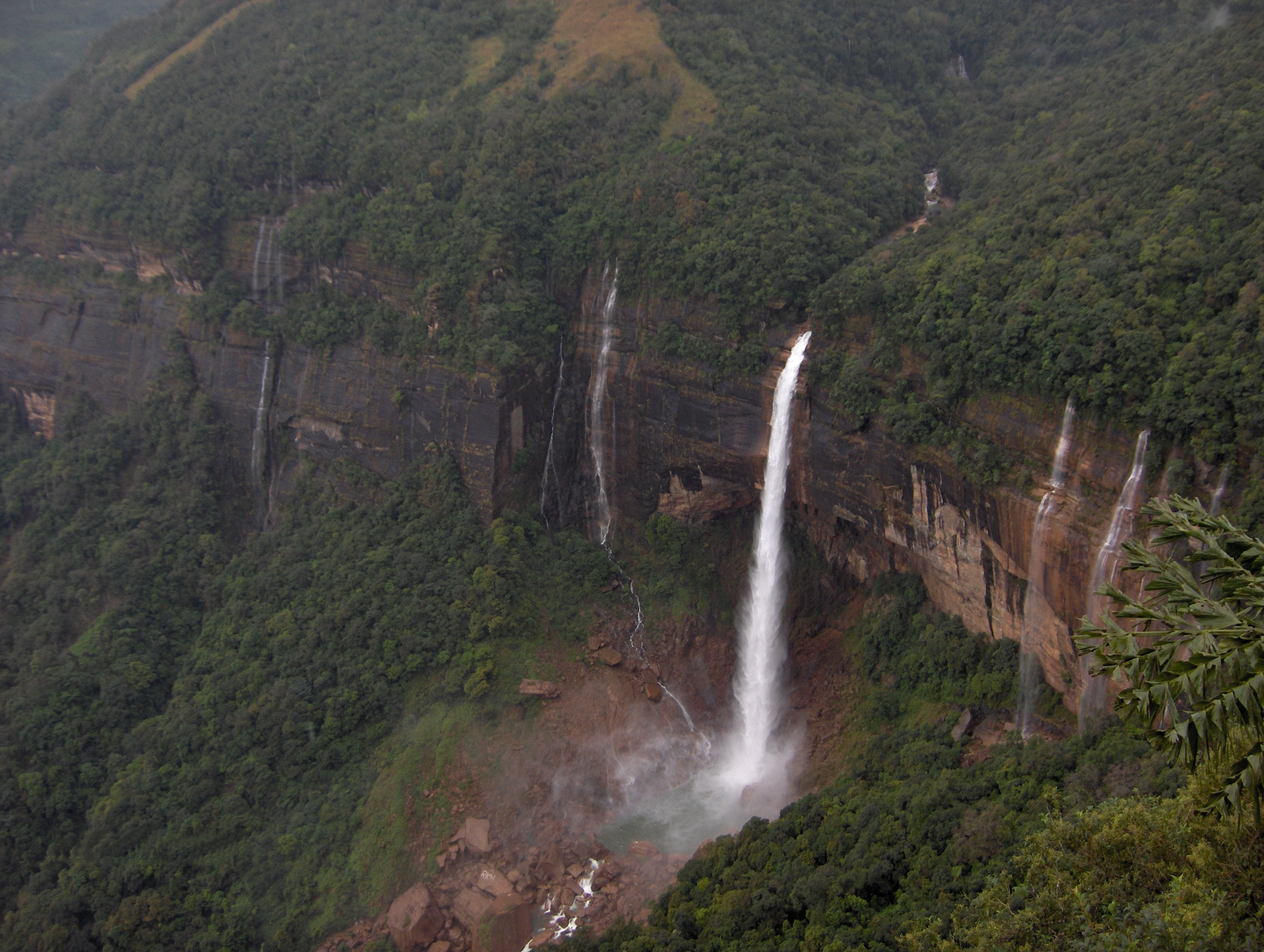
Nohkalikai Falls

Meghalaya features high‑rainfall subtropical forests and biodiverse hill landscapes across the Khasi, Jaintia, and Garo Hills, with protected areas including Nokrek National Park (core of the UNESCO-recognised Nokrek Biosphere Reserve) and Balpakram National Park.

The state's living root bridges—locally known as jingkieng jri—were added to UNESCO's Tentative List in 2022 as “Jingkieng jri: Living Root Bridge Cultural Landscapes of Meghalaya.”

Around Umiam Lake, visitors can access boating and water‑sports facilities at sites managed near Shillong and in Ri‑Bhoi district.

Selected places: - Nokrek National Park — Core of the Nokrek Biosphere Reserve on the Tura Range, noted for evergreen forests and wild citrus diversity (Citrus indica). - Balpakram National Park — Plateau and canyon landscapes in South Garo Hills with trekking experiences described by the state tourism authority. - Umiam Lake — Reservoir with boating and water‑sport options near Shillong and Nongpoh in Ri‑Bhoi district. - Living root bridges — Indigenous Ficus‑based structures across southern Meghalaya valleys, on UNESCO's Tentative List since 2022.

== Mizoram ==
Mizoram is a hill state in Northeast India known for subtropical evergreen forests, birdlife, and community-based tourism promoted by the state tourism department.

Protected areas include Dampa Tiger Reserve in Mamit district and Ngengpui Wildlife Sanctuary in Lawngtlai district, noted for elephants, primates, hornbills, and other fauna of the Indo–Burma region.

The state bird, Mrs. Hume's pheasant (Syrmaticus humiae), is the focus of local conservation initiatives and birdwatching interest.

Cultural heritage sites include Mizo Poets’ Square (Mizo Hlakungpui Mual) at Khawbung and the megalithic complex of Kawtchhuah Ropui near Vangchhia, the latter notified as a centrally protected monument by the Archaeological Survey of India.

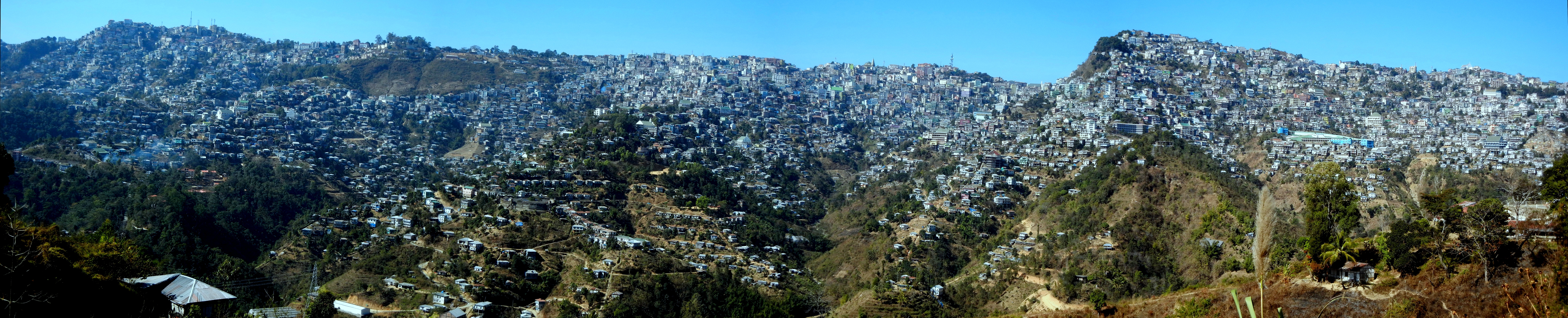
A panorama of Aizawl taken from Zemabawk.

== Odisha ==
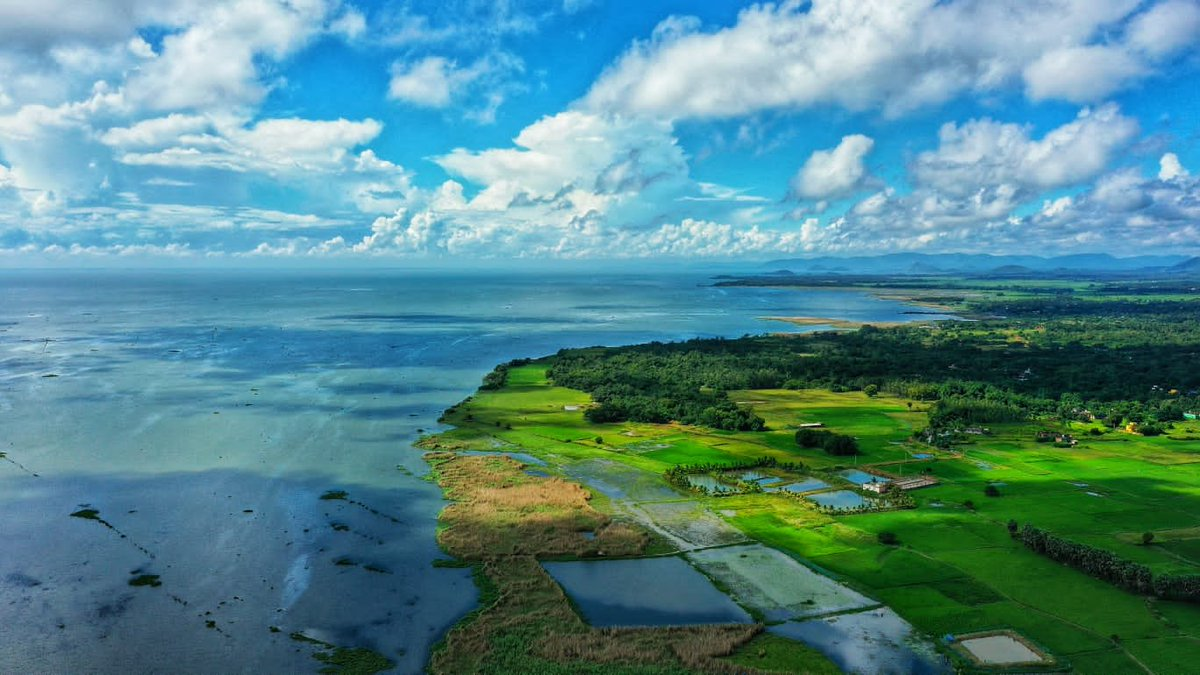
Chilika Lake, a large brackish water lagoon

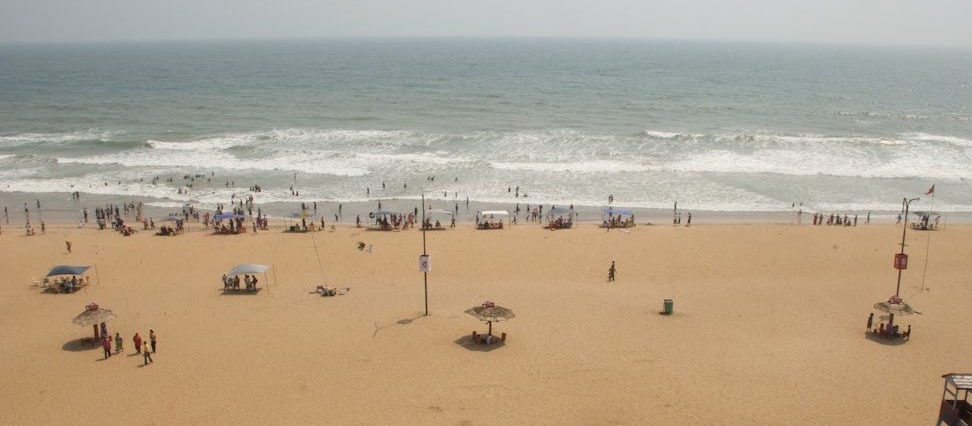
Konark beach near Konark Sun Temple

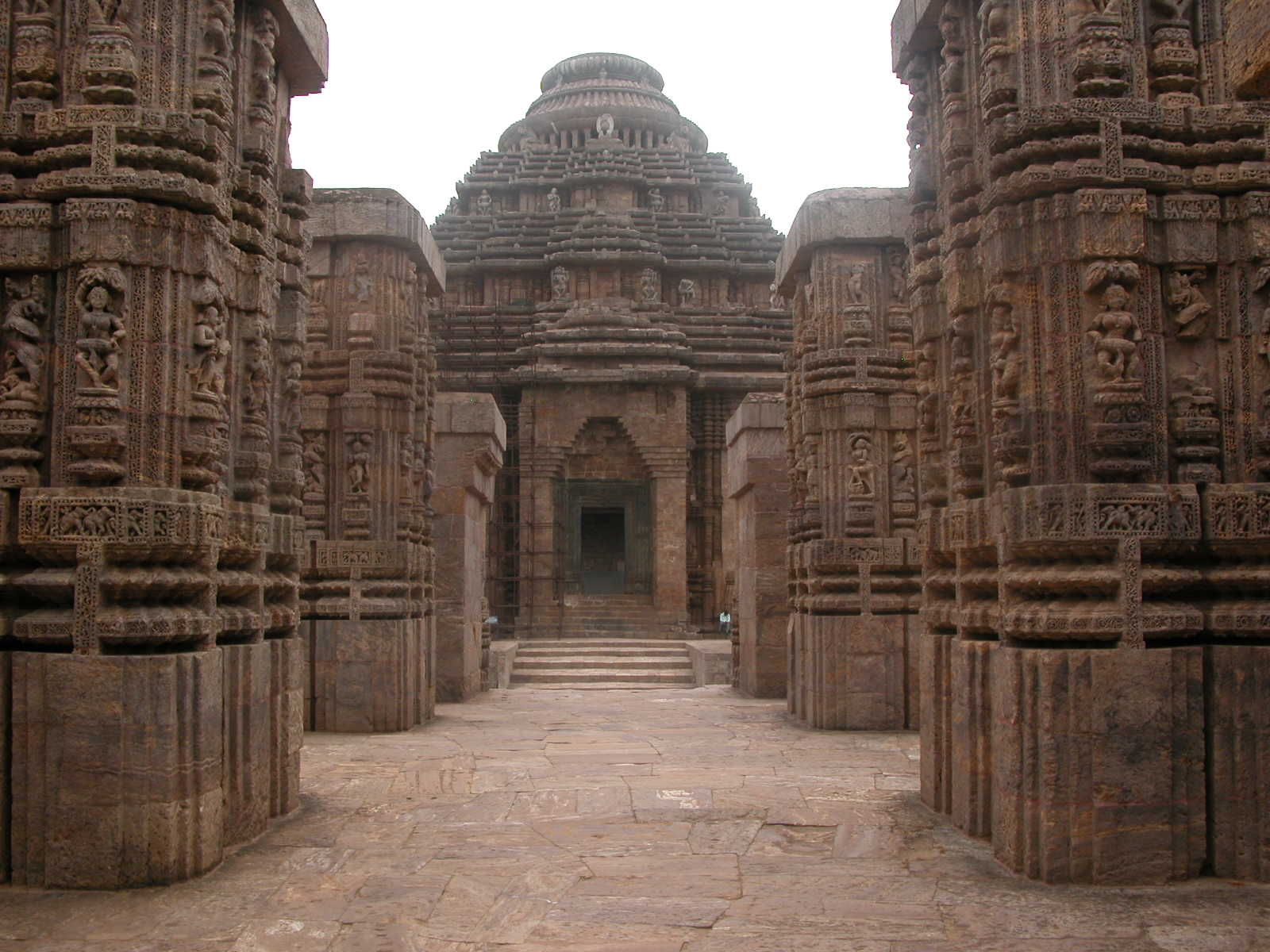
Konark Sun Temple, a UNESCO World Heritage Site

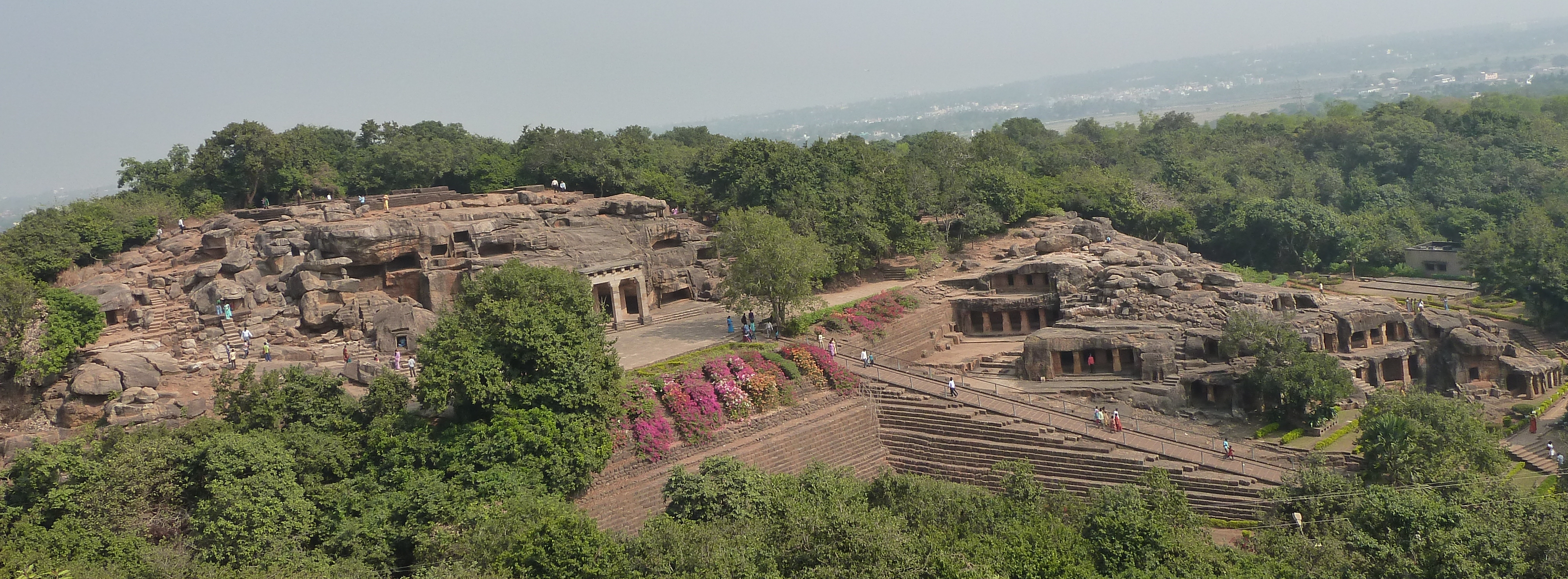
Udayagiri and Khandagiri Caves near Bhubaneswar

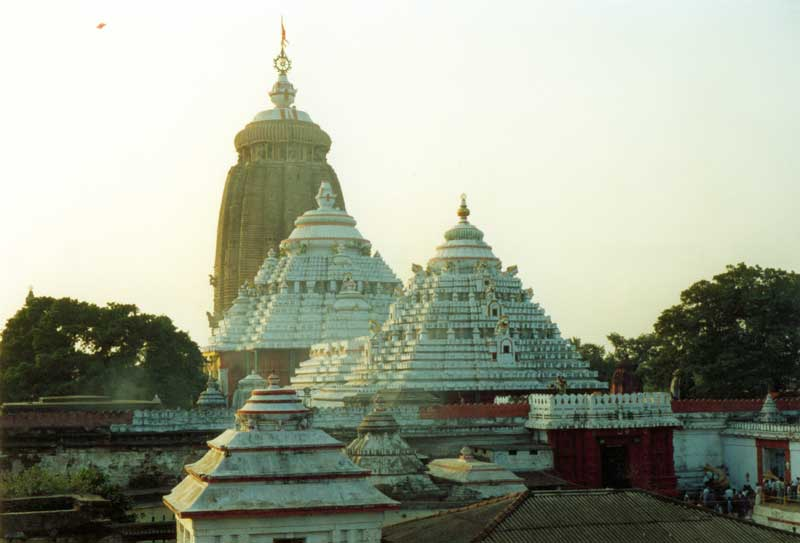
Jagannath Temple, Puri

Odisha features coastal wetlands, temple cities, Buddhist heritage sites, and protected forests from the Mahanadi delta to the Eastern Ghats foothills. The state includes the UNESCO World Heritage Konark Sun Temple, the Ramsar‑listed Chilika Lake, and the Ramsar‑listed Bhitarkanika Mangroves.

Chilika is a brackish lagoon along the Bay of Bengal, important for migratory waterbirds and fisheries; management initiatives have addressed past siltation issues documented under the Ramsar Convention. In the northern delta, the Bhitarkanika mangrove ecosystem supports saltwater crocodiles and marine turtle nesting beaches and is recognized as a wetland of international importance.

Bhubaneswar, Puri, and Konark form a historic "temple triangle," with Kalinga‑style monuments and pilgrimage traditions centred on the Shree Jagannath Temple and the annual Rath Yatra. Early historic rock‑cut retreats at the Udayagiri and Khandagiri Caves lie on twin hills near Bhubaneswar and are maintained in part by the Archaeological Survey of India.

Buddhist sites such as Lalitgiri, Ratnagiri, and Udayagiri (Jajpur) preserve monastic remains of the "Diamond Triangle," while the Ashokan rock edicts at Dhauli document imperial inscriptions associated with Kalinga in the 3rd century BCE.

Two of India's surviving Chausathi (64) Yogini shrines are located in Odisha, at Hirapur (Khurda) and Ranipur Jharial (Balangir). The Similipal landscape in Mayurbhanj forms a UNESCO‑recognized biosphere reserve under the Man and the Biosphere Programme.

Selected places: - Bhubaneswar – Historic temples including Lingaraja Temple and Rajarani Temple; nearby Udayagiri and Khandagiri Caves and the rock edicts at Dhauli. - Puri – Jagannath Temple and coastal attractions; annual Rath Yatra. - Konark – Konark Sun Temple and coastal belt. - Chilika Lake – Brackish lagoon with important bird habitats and fisheries. - Bhitarkanika – Mangrove wetlands and wildlife in the lower Mahanadi–Brahmani–Baitarani delta. - Similipal Biosphere Reserve – Forested plateau and waterfalls in Mayurbhanj. - Hirapur and Ranipur Jharial – Two surviving 64‑Yogini temples in Odisha.

== Puducherry ==
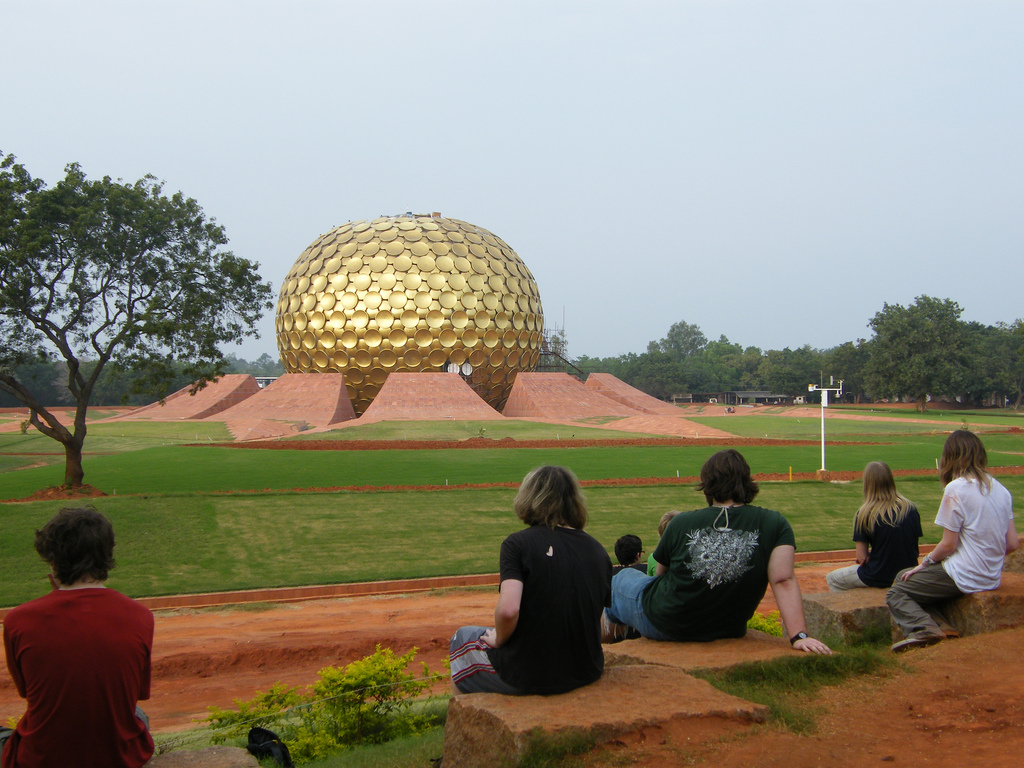
The Matrimandir in Auroville, near Puducherry

The Union Territory of Puducherry comprises four coastal regions—Puducherry, Karaikal, Mahé, and Yanam—administered as a single UT with enclaves across South India. The capital, Puducherry, preserves a historic French Quarter with colonial-era urban fabric alongside temples, churches, and civic buildings.

Nearby Auroville features the Matrimandir and its Peace Area, a landscaped precinct at the township's centre that serves as a quiet meditation space and symbolic "soul" of the city.

== Punjab ==
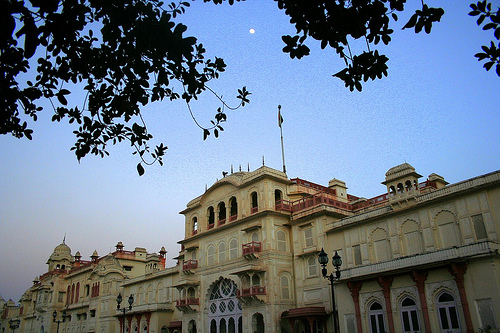
Moti Bagh Palace in Patiala

Punjab is a northwestern Indian state noted for Sikh heritage, historic cities, and festivals across destinations such as Amritsar, Anandpur Sahib, Patiala, and Pathankot.

Selected places: - Amritsar – Sri Harmandir Sahib (Golden Temple), the Jallianwala Bagh memorial, and the daily Attari–Wagah border ceremony. - Anandpur Sahib – Virasat-e-Khalsa museum and the annual Hola Mohalla festival. - Patiala – Palaces and forts including Moti Bagh Palace, Sheesh Mahal, and the Qila Mubarak complex. - Pathankot – Ranjit Sagar Dam (Thein Dam) on the Ravi River; day‑trip access from the district headquarters.

== Rajasthan ==
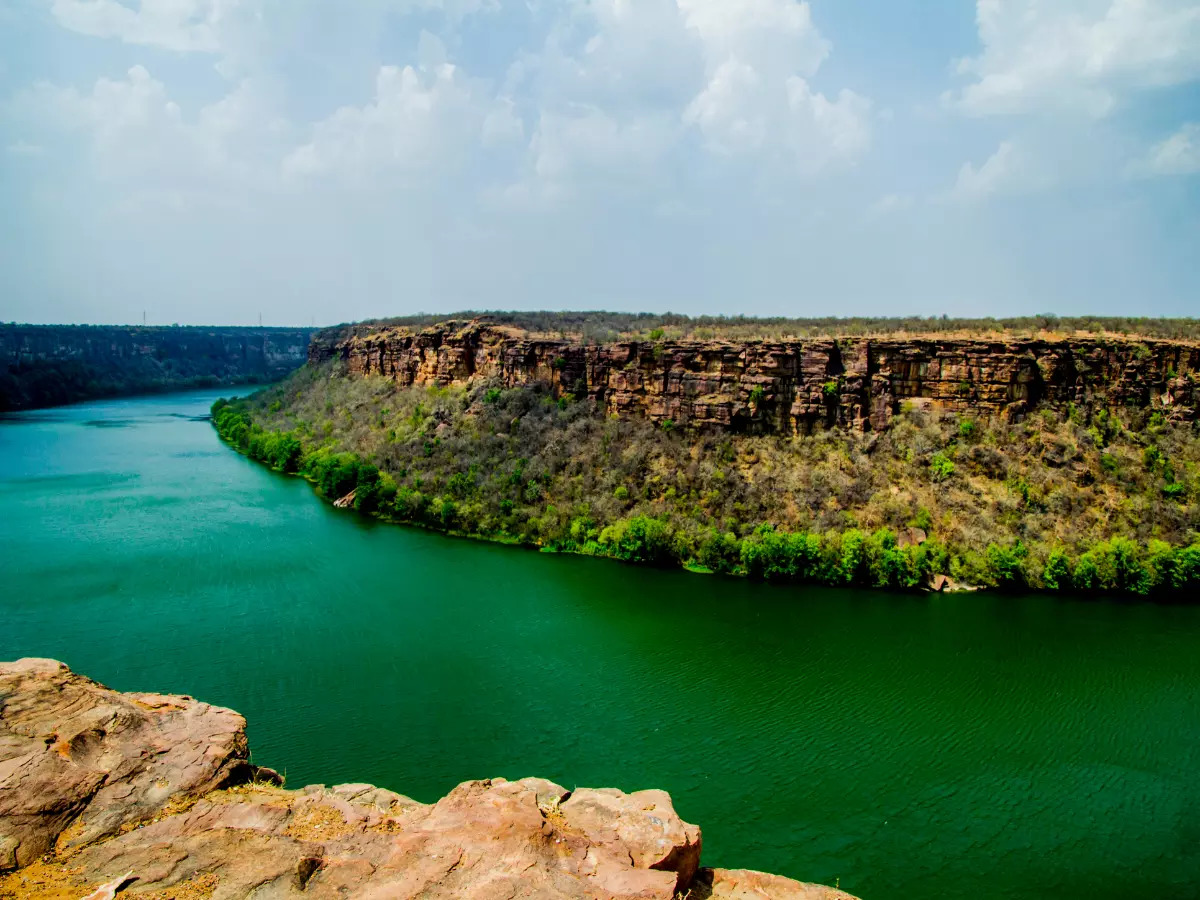
Chambal River gorge near Kota

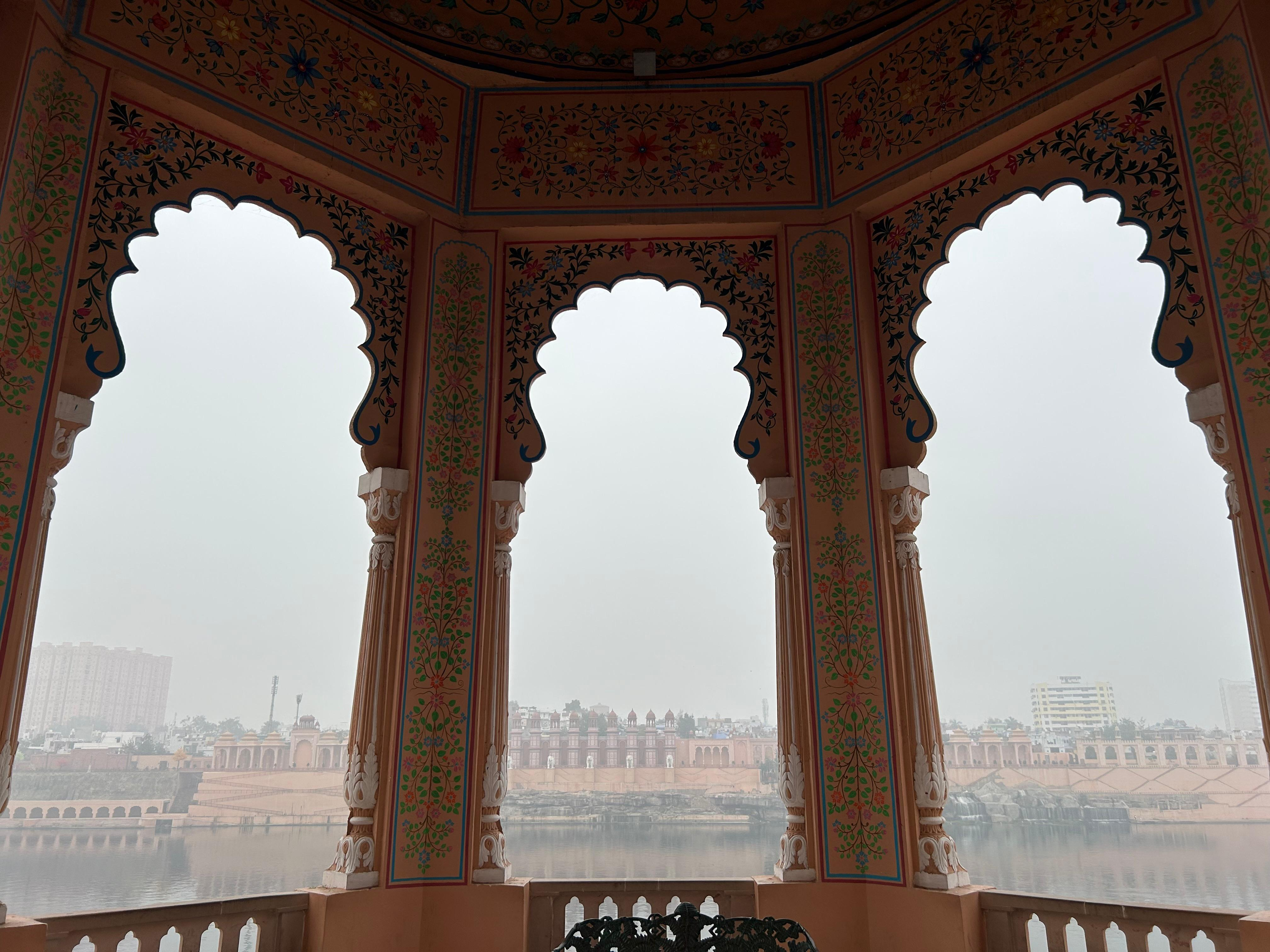
Chambal riverfront in Kota

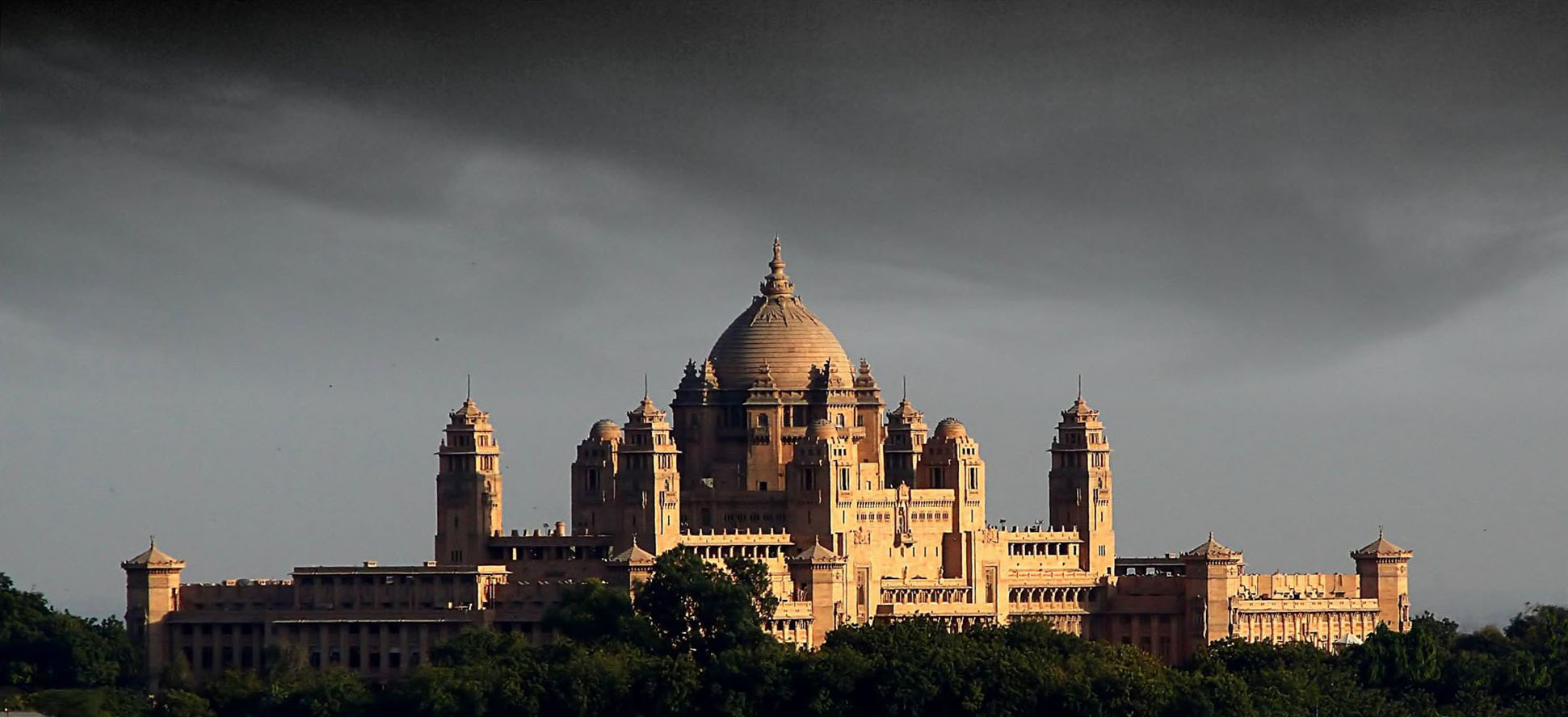
Umaid Bhawan Palace in Jodhpur

Rajasthan is a state in northwestern India noted for desert landscapes, historic cities, and a concentration of major forts and palaces, including UNESCO‑listed hill forts and a World Heritage wetland at Bharatpur.

Selected places - Kota - Chambal riverfront, Chambal River gorge near Garadia Mahadev - Jaipur — Historic walled city with palaces and gateways; nearby Amber Fort forms part of the UNESCO serial property "Hill Forts of Rajasthan." - Jodhpur — City dominated by Mehrangarh Fort and sandstone palaces including Umaid Bhawan Palace. - Udaipur — Palaces and temples around lakes including Lake Pichola and Jag Mandir. - Jaisalmer — Living fort town in the Thar; Jaisalmer Fort is included in the UNESCO "Hill Forts of Rajasthan." - Bharatpur — Keoladeo National Park (Keoladeo Ghana), a UNESCO World Heritage wetland known for migratory and resident waterbirds. - Sawai Madhopur — Ranthambore National Park; Ranthambore Fort is part of the UNESCO hill forts serial property. - Chittorgarh and Kumbhalgarh — Rajput hill forts included in the UNESCO serial property.

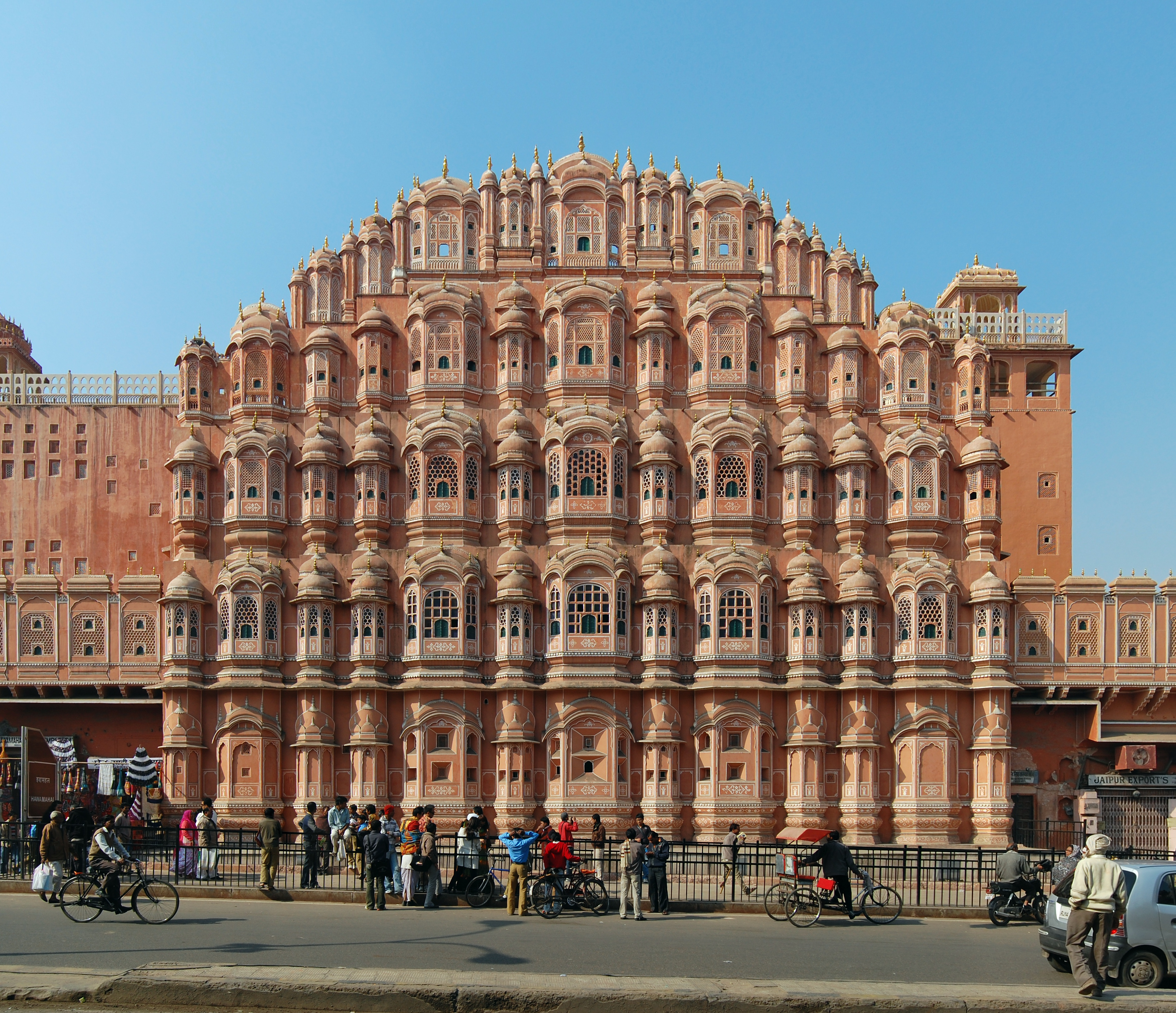
Hawa Mahal in Jaipur

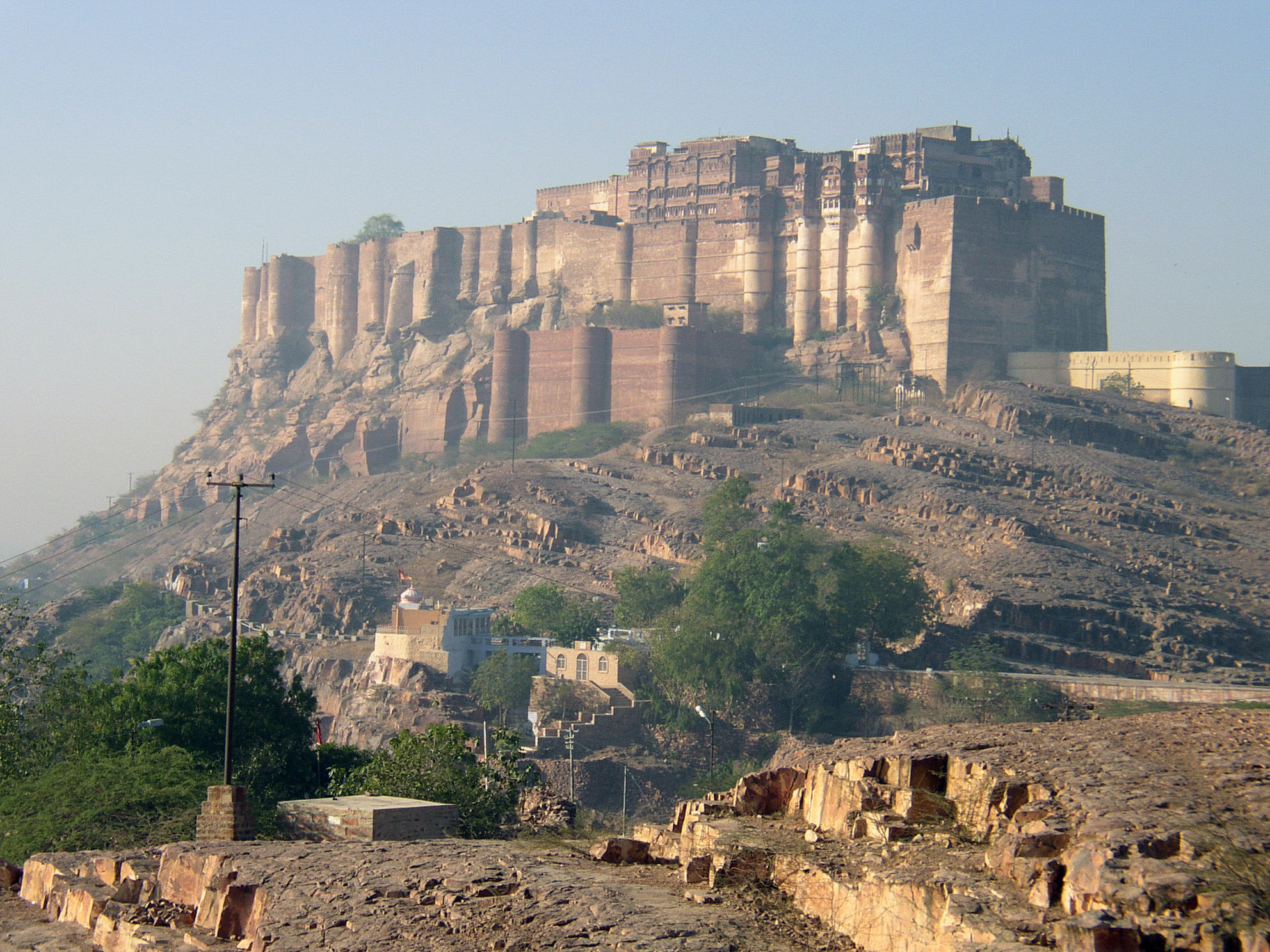
Mehrangarh Fort in Jodhpur

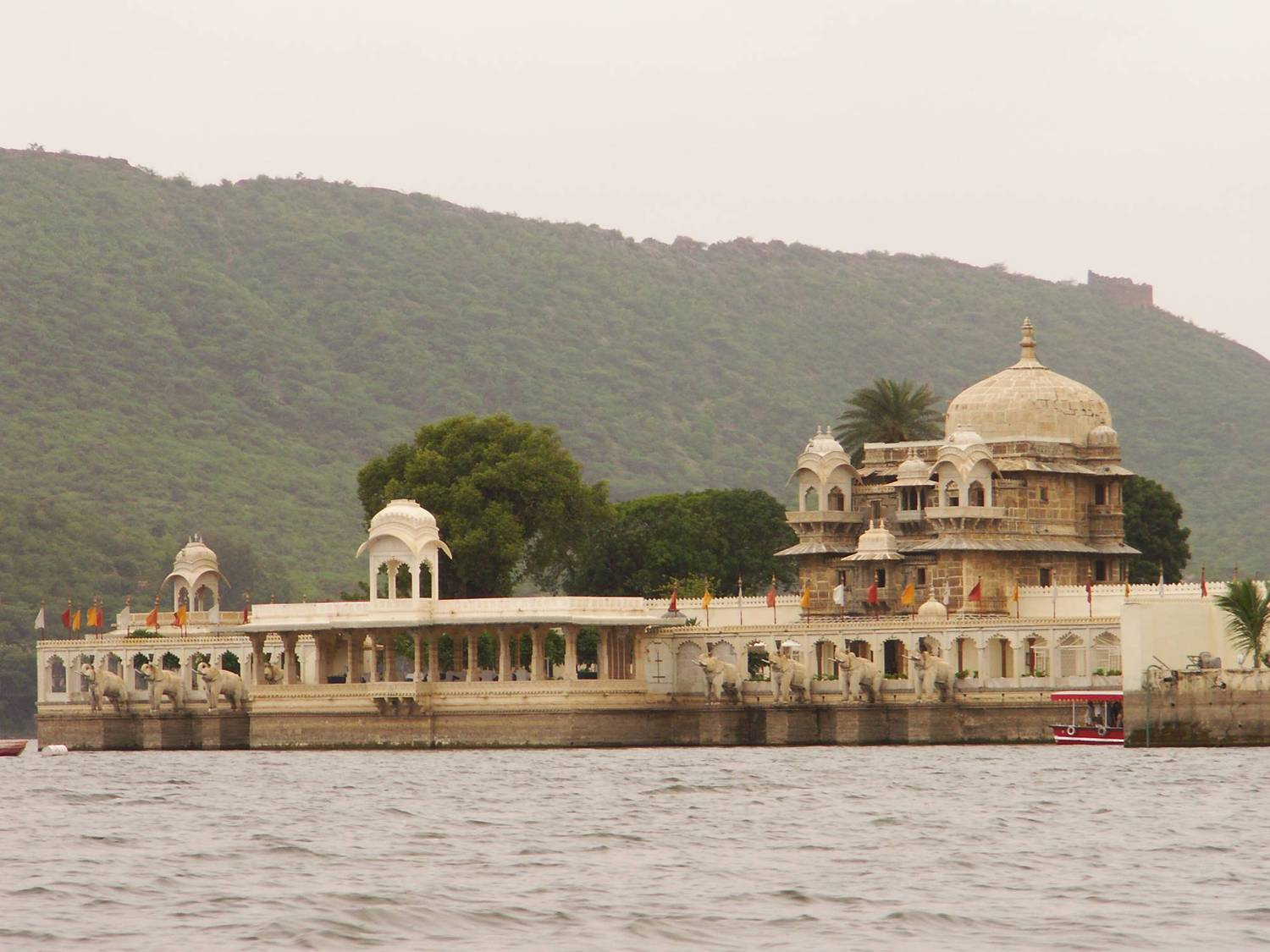
Jag Mandir in Udaipur

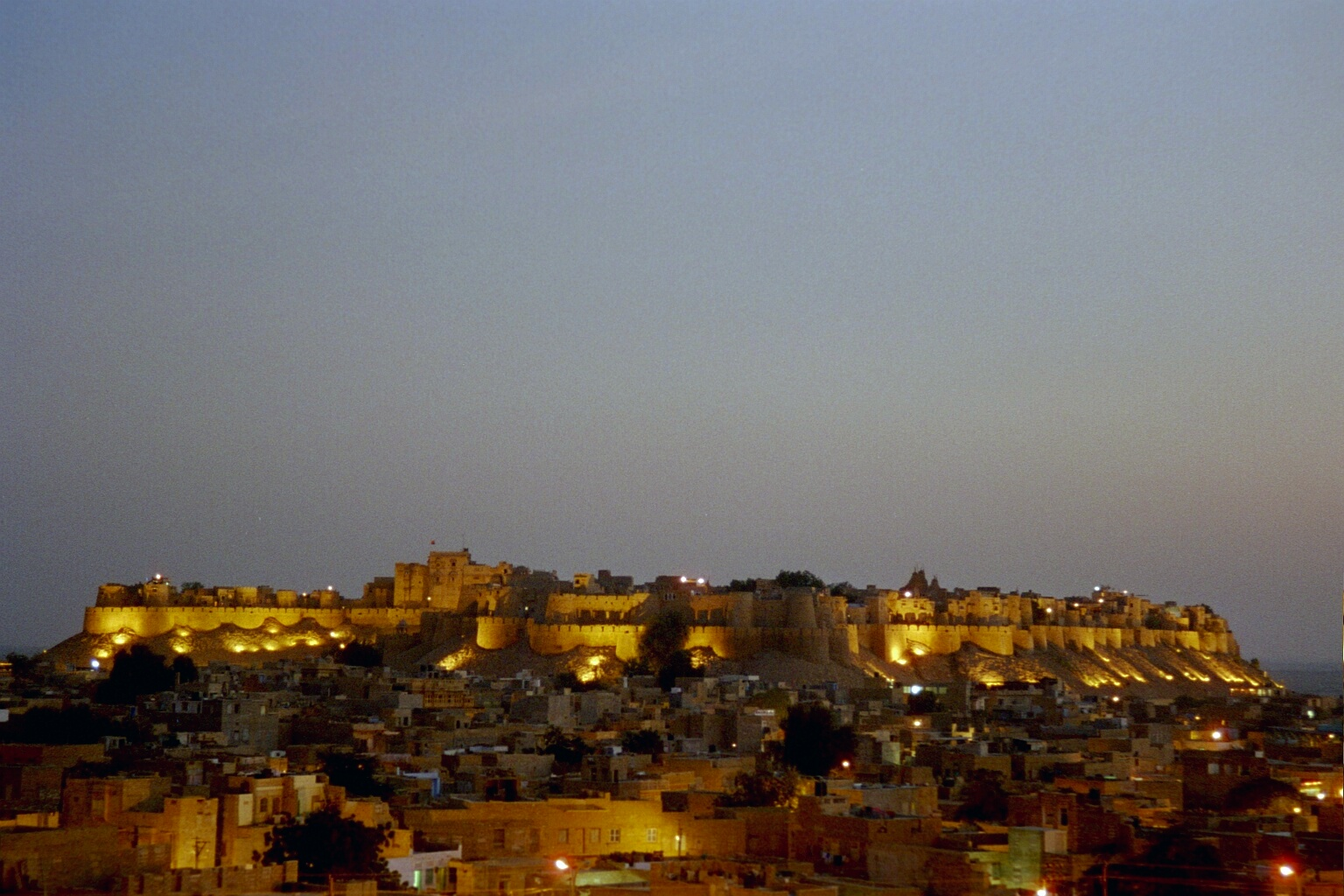
Jaisalmer Fort (part of the UNESCO "Hill Forts of Rajasthan")

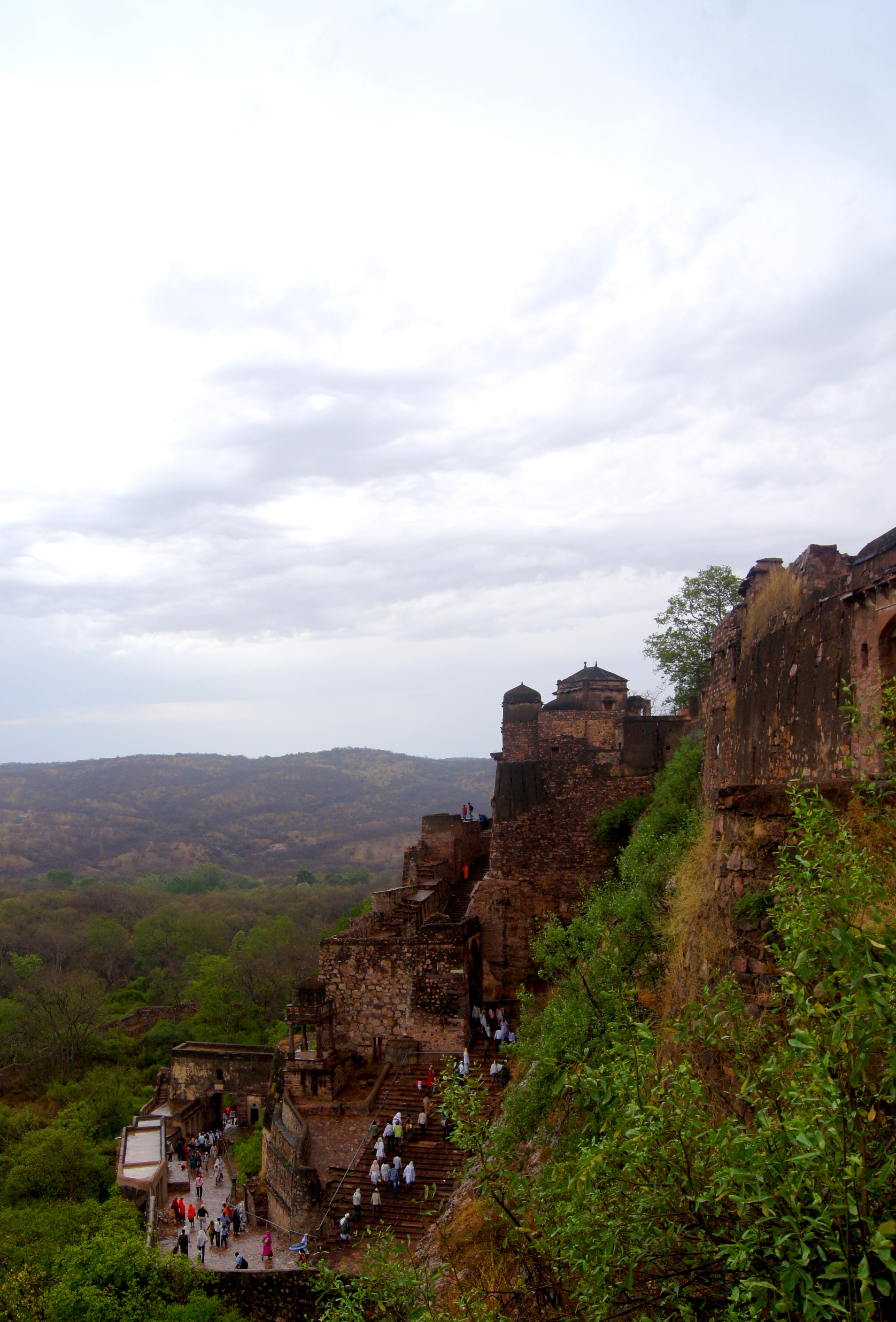
Ranthambore Fort (UNESCO "Hill Forts of Rajasthan")

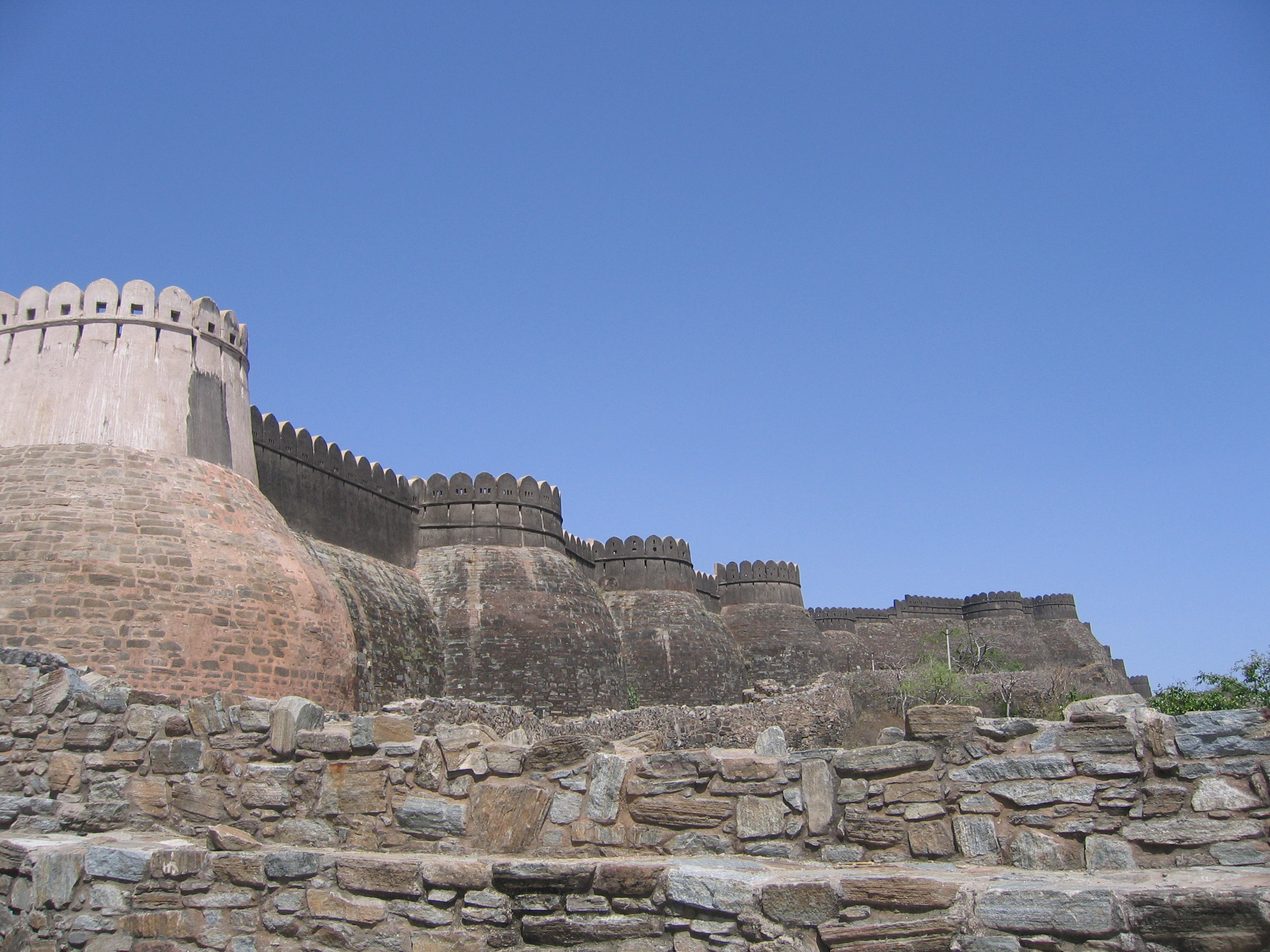
Kumbhalgarh (UNESCO "Hill Forts of Rajasthan")

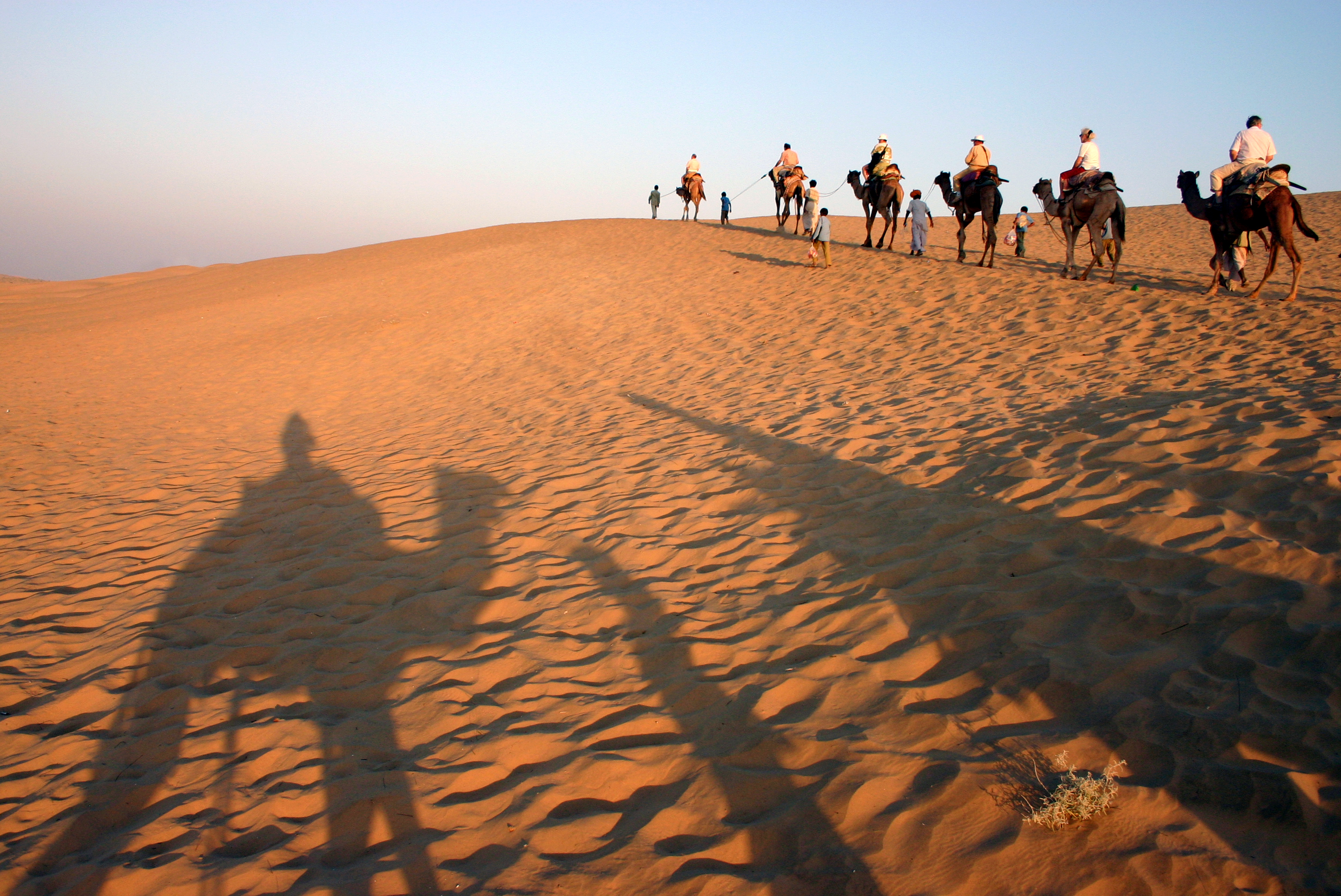
Thar Desert near Jaisalmer

== Sikkim ==
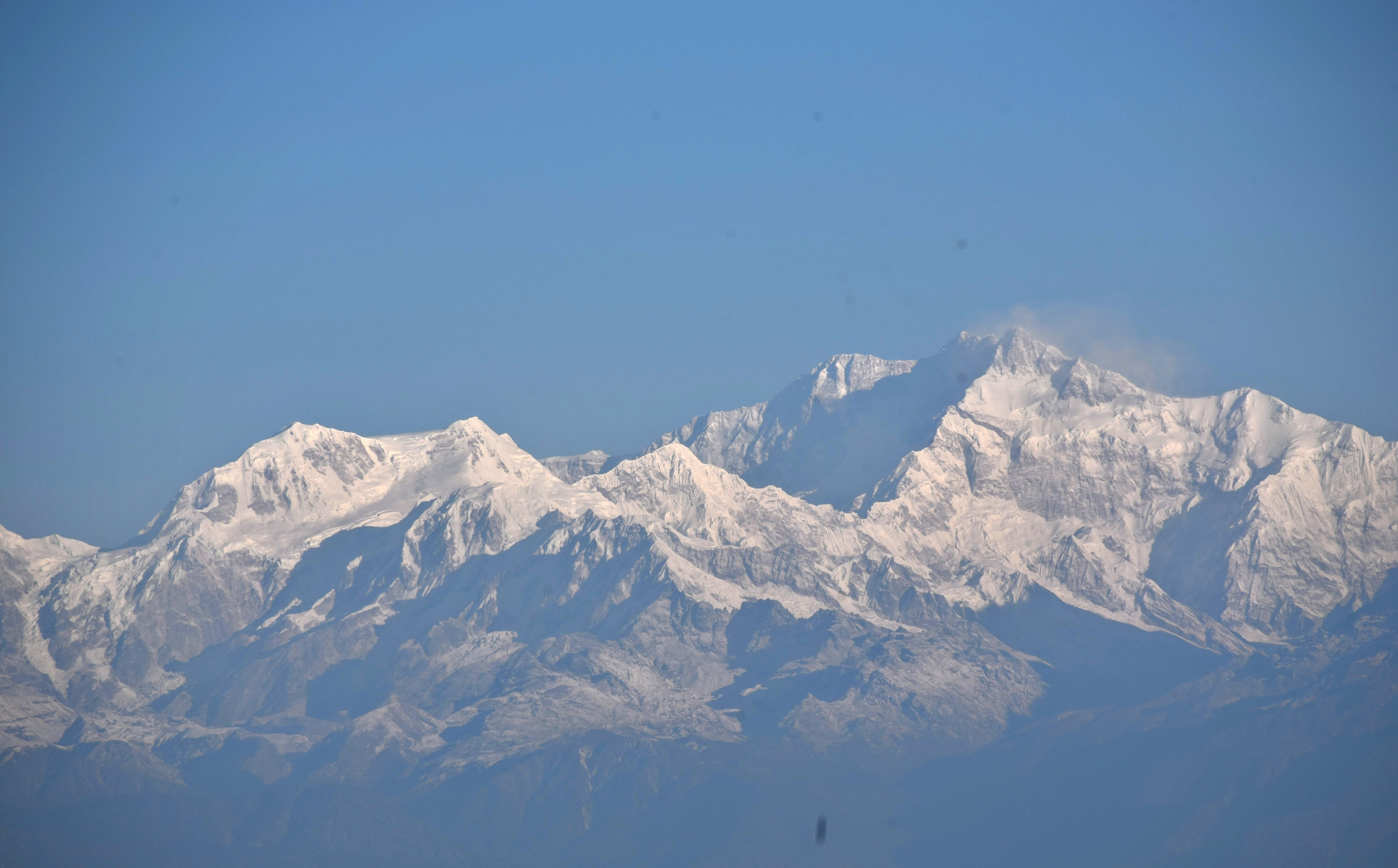
Kangchenjunga, the third highest mountain in the world

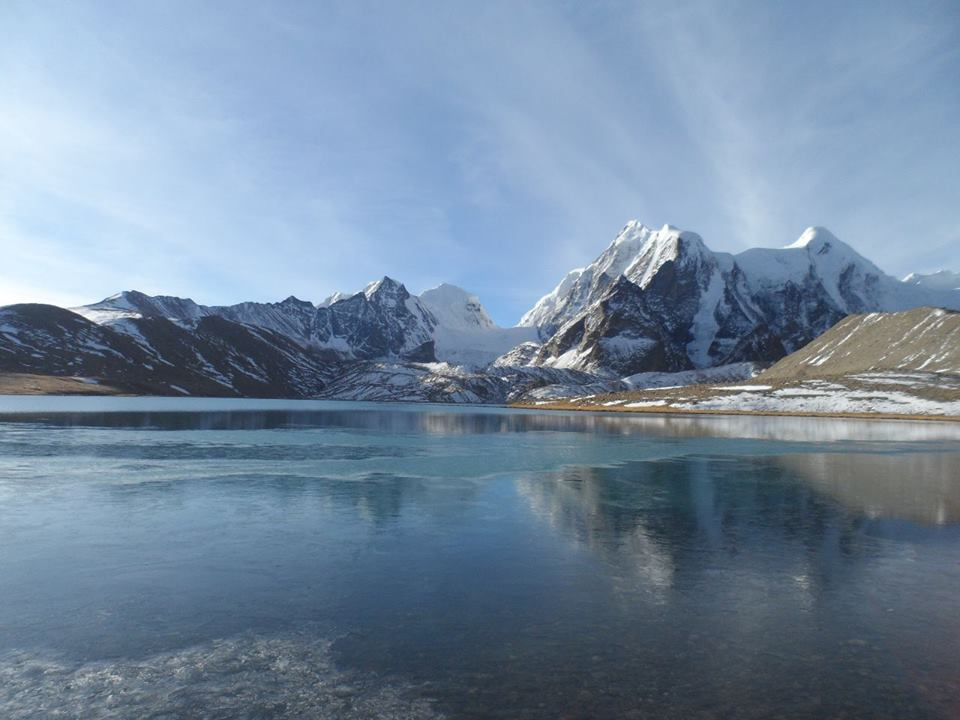
Gurudongmar Lake, Sikkim

Gangtok is the capital of Sikkim and a base for visits to monasteries, lakes, viewpoints, and heritage sites across the state. Air access is available via Pakyong Airport within Sikkim and via Bagdogra Airport in neighboring West Bengal, while rail access is via New Jalpaiguri.

Selected places: - Nathu La and Tsomgo Lake near Gangtok, with high mountain views and seasonal snow. - Rumtek Monastery and the Namgyal Institute of Tibetology in and around Gangtok. - Pelling, Yuksom, and Rabdentse in West Sikkim for monasteries, former royal sites, and views of the Kangchenjunga range. - Gurudongmar Lake in North Sikkim, a high-altitude excursion that is subject to permits and local conditions.

High-altitude trekking routes include Dzongri and Goecha La, with entries and logistics facilitated by registered operators under state regulations and permit requirements for certain protected areas.

== Tamil Nadu ==
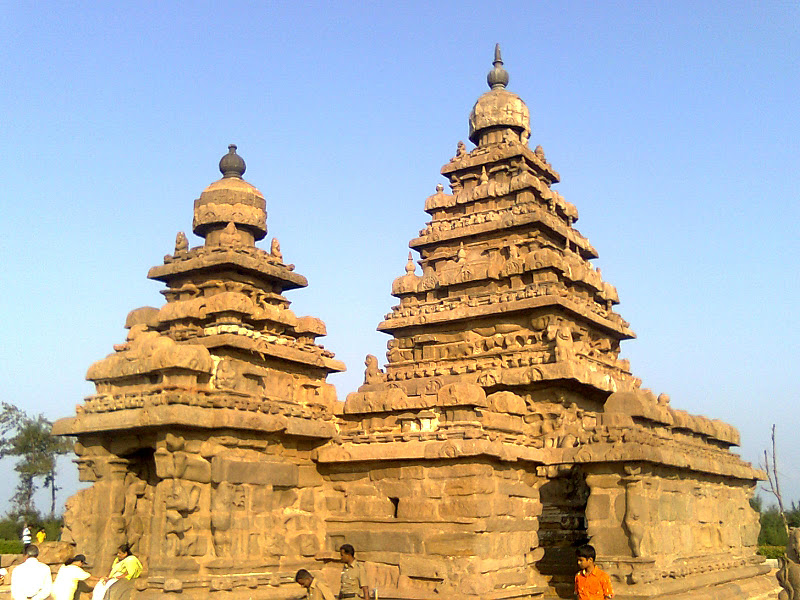
Shore Temple at Mahabalipuram (part of the Group of Monuments at Mahabalipuram)

Tamil Nadu features historic temple cities, Western Ghats landscapes, and rail heritage that includes three UNESCO inscriptions: the Great Living Chola Temples, the Mahabalipuram monuments, and the Nilgiri Mountain Railway within the "Mountain Railways of India".

Temples

The Great Living Chola Temples comprise Brihadeeswarar Temple at Thanjavur, Brihadisvara Temple at Gangaikondacholapuram, and Airavatesvara Temple at Darasuram, illustrating Chola-period architecture and sculpture. Pallava-era rock-cut and structural monuments at Mahabalipuram include rathas, cave shrines, large open-air reliefs, and the Shore Temple on the Coromandel coast. Other prominent temple centres include Madurai (Meenakshi Amman), Rameswaram (Ramanathaswamy), Srirangam (Sri Ranganathaswamy), and Kanchipuram (Kailasanathar).

Sanctuaries and national parks

Parts of Tamil Nadu lie within the UNESCO-inscribed Western Ghats serial property noted for biodiversity. The state's tiger conservation network includes Anamalai Tiger Reserve, Mudumalai Tiger Reserve, Sathyamangalam Tiger Reserve, and Kalakkad Mundanthurai Tiger Reserve. Along the southeast coast, the Gulf of Mannar Biosphere Reserve includes islands and nearshore habitats with seagrass beds, mangroves, and coral reefs recognized in UNESCO's Man and the Biosphere Programme.

Hill stations and rail heritage

Ooty, Kodaikanal, and Yercaud are established hill stations in the Ghats, and the Nilgiri Mountain Railway is inscribed as part of the UNESCO "Mountain Railways of India".

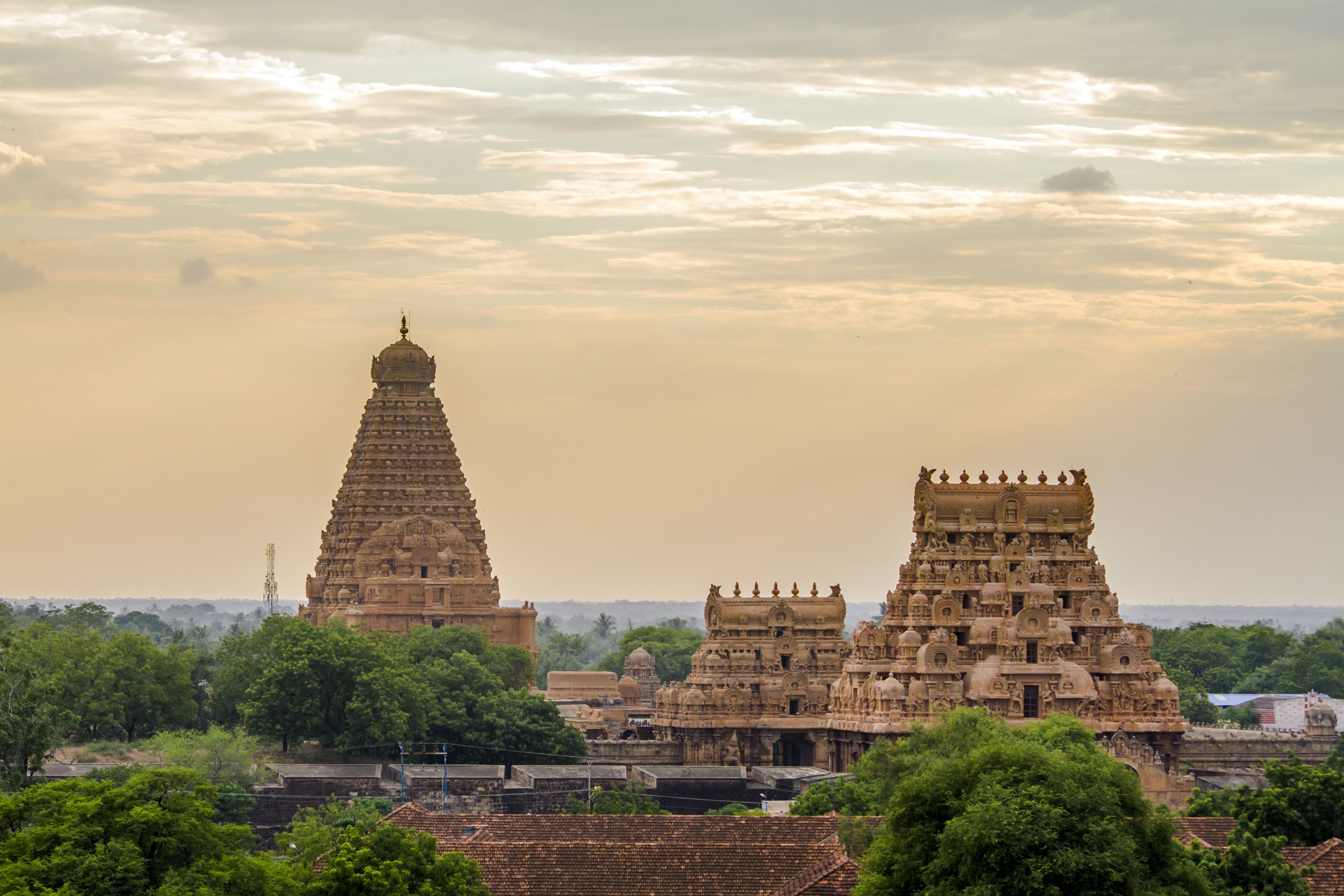
Brihadeeswarar Temple at Thanjavur (UNESCO "Great Living Chola Temples")

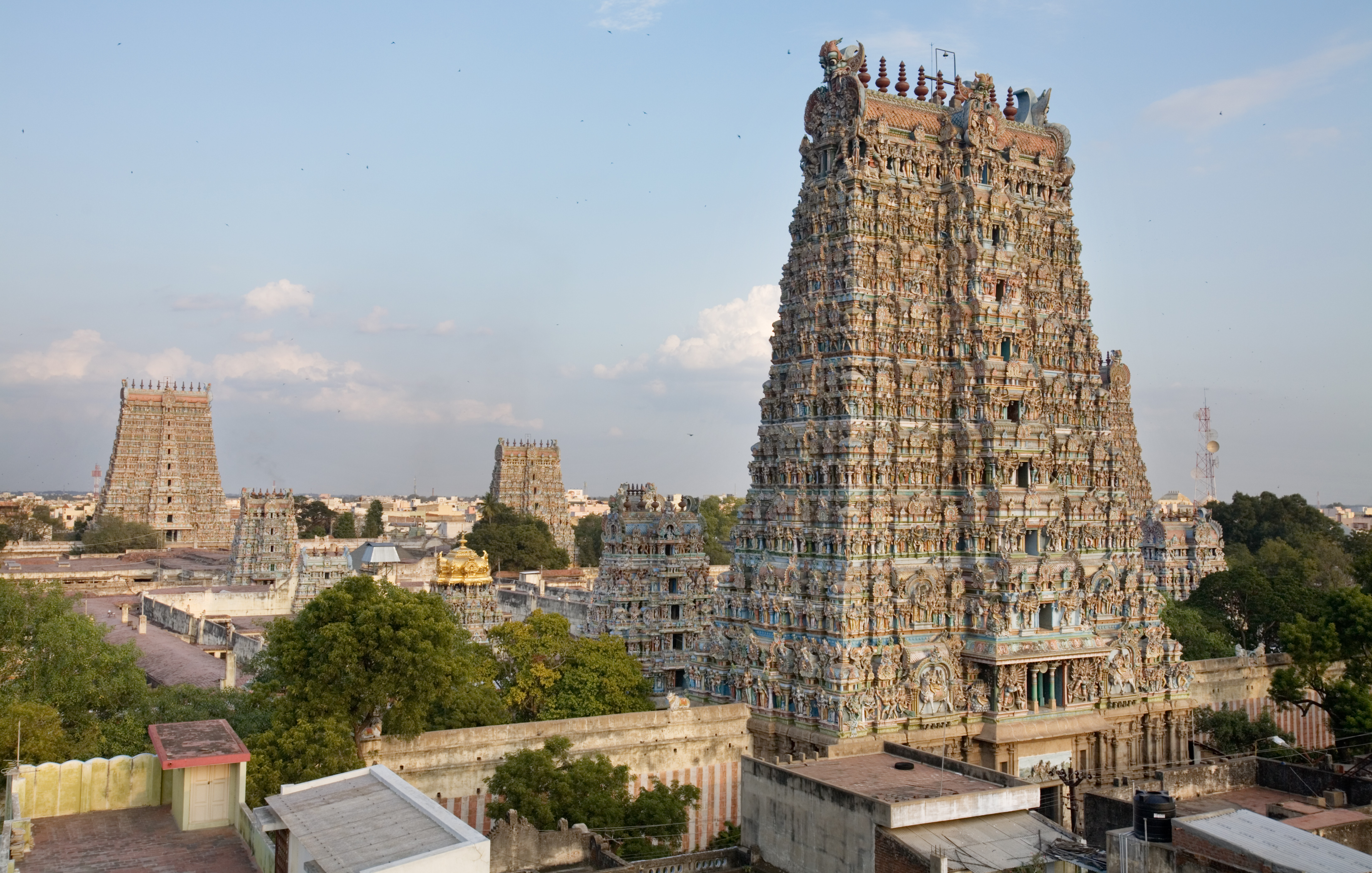
Meenakshi Amman Temple at Madurai

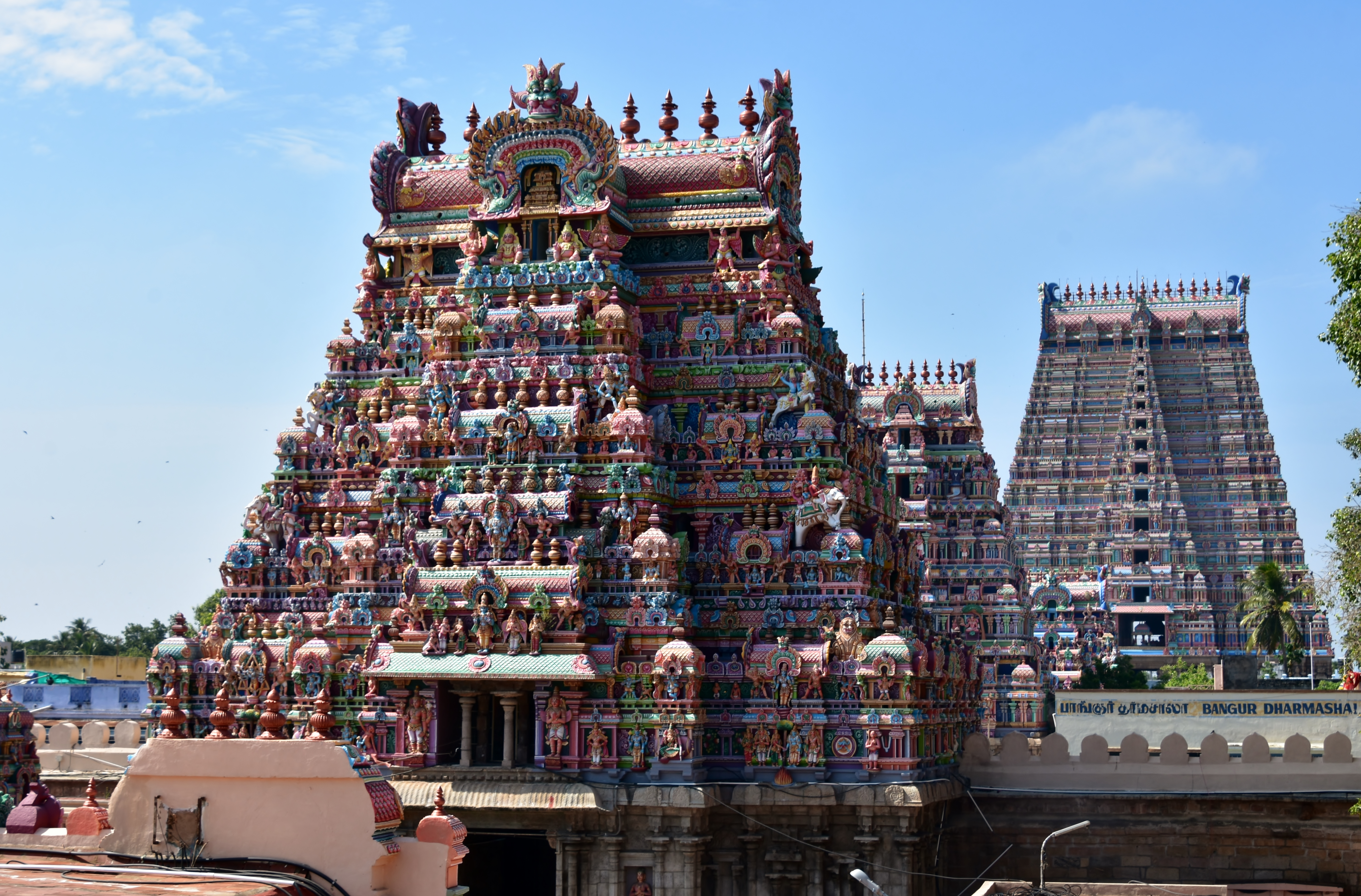
Ranganathaswamy Temple, Srirangam

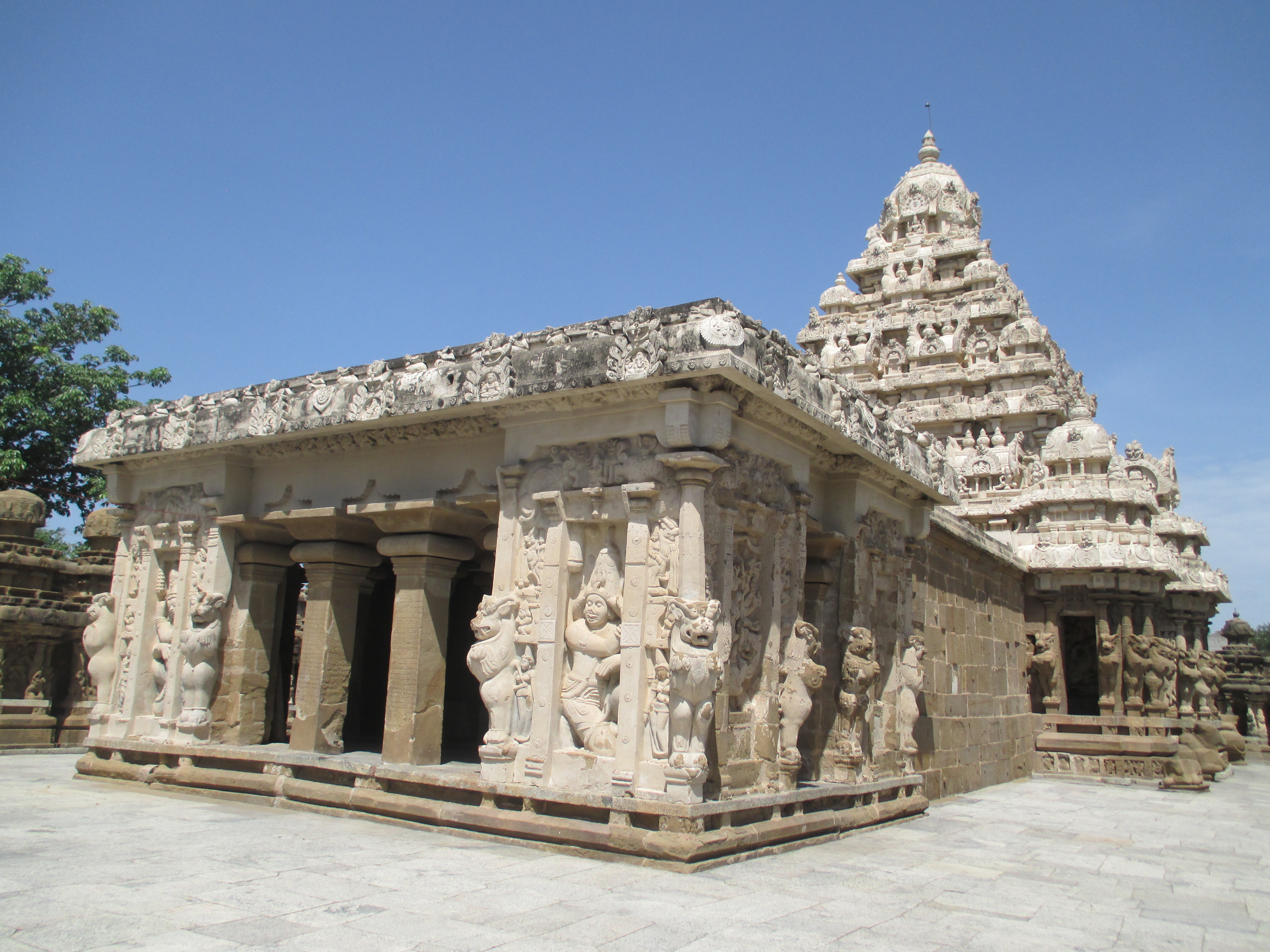
Kanchi Kailasanathar Temple, Kanchipuram

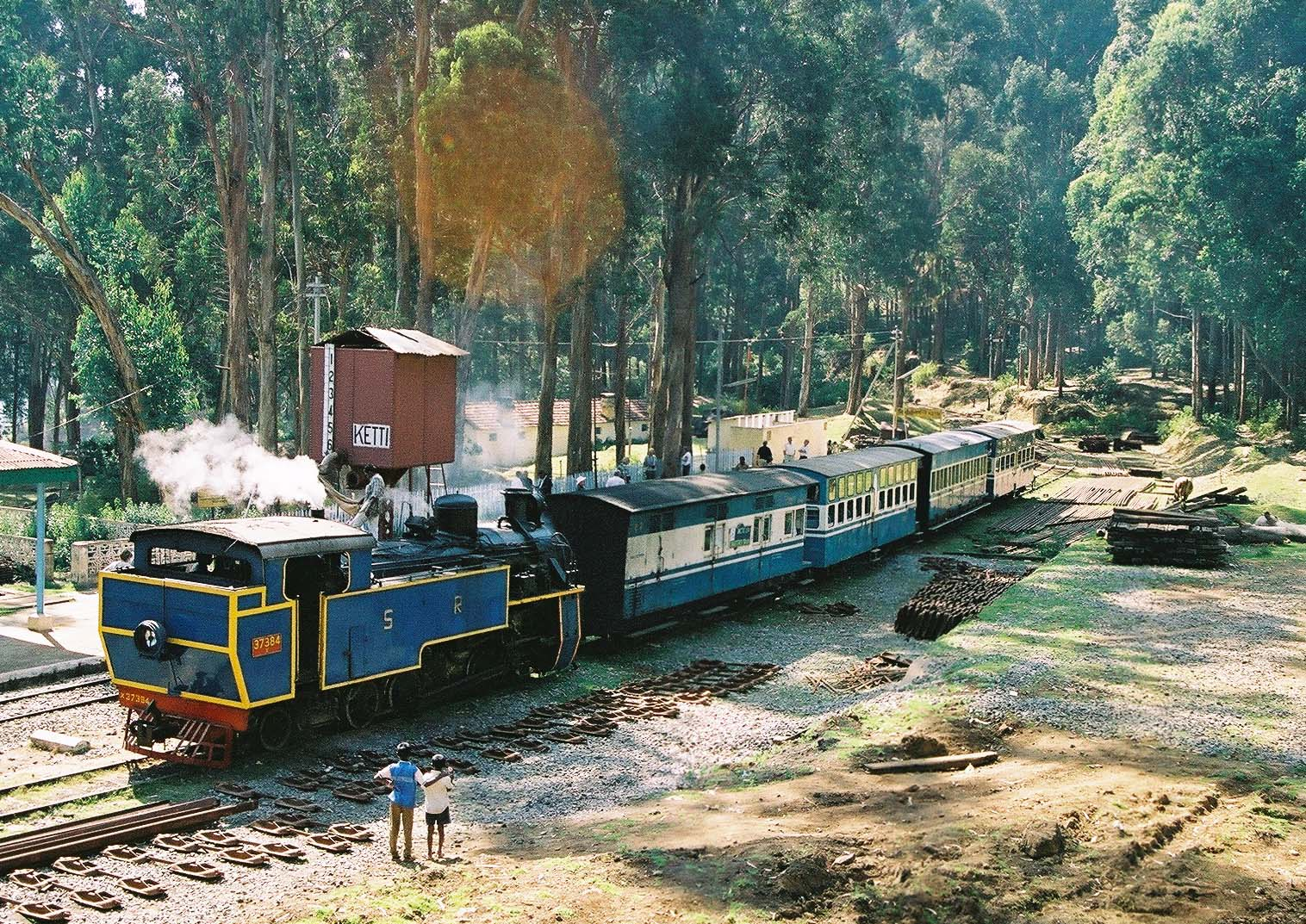
Nilgiri Mountain Railway (UNESCO "Mountain Railways of India")

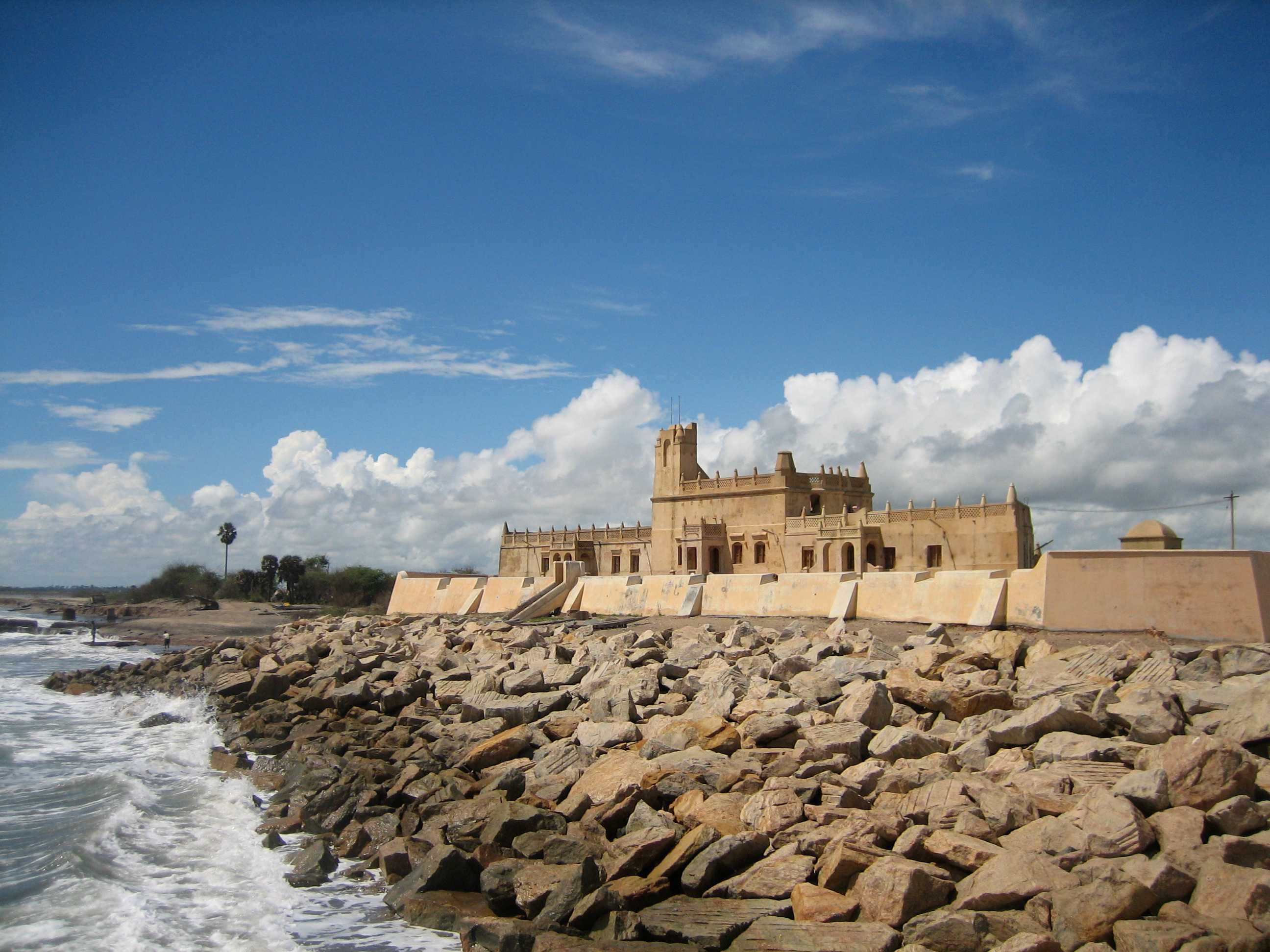
Fort Dansborg at Tharangambadi

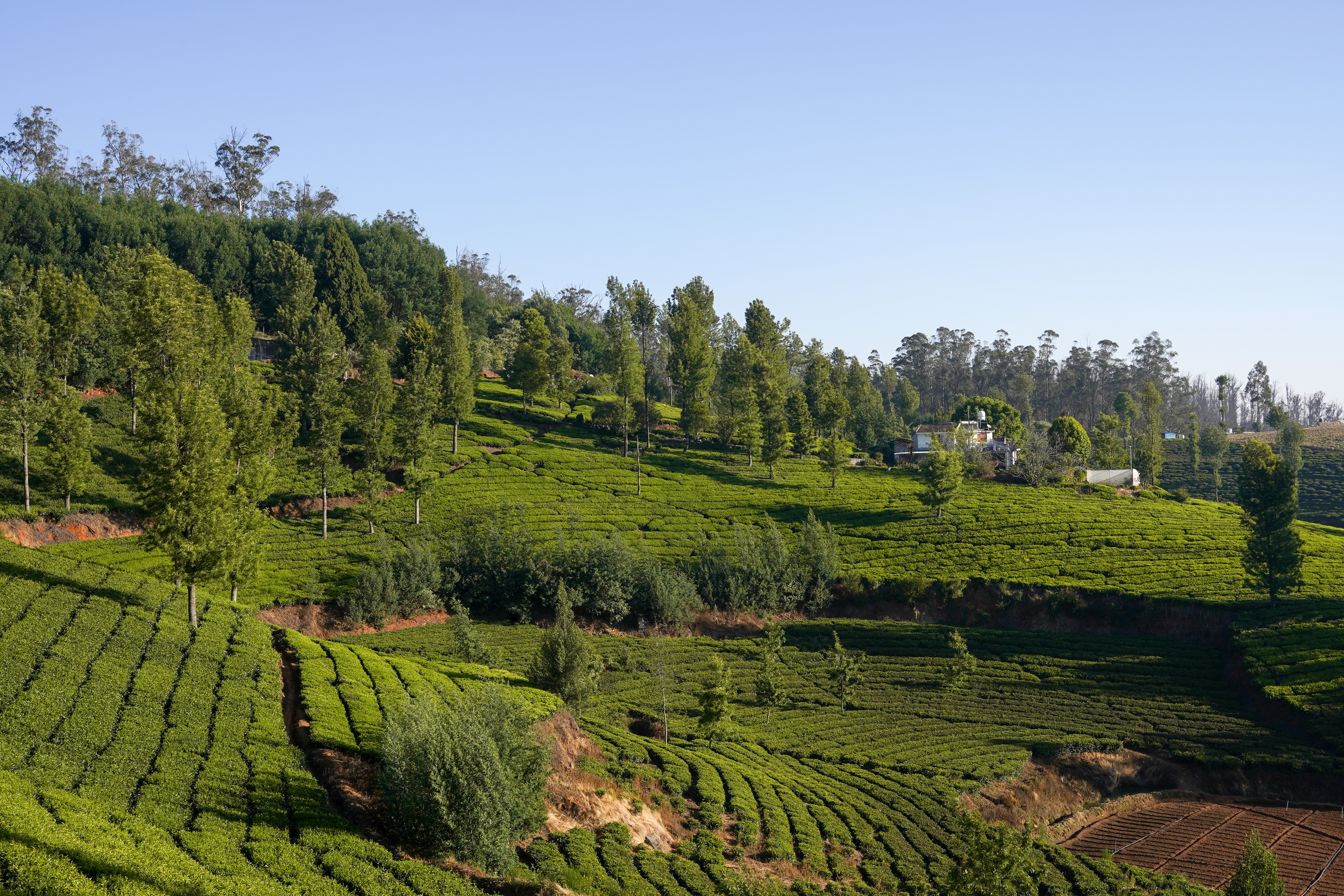
Tea plantation near Ooty

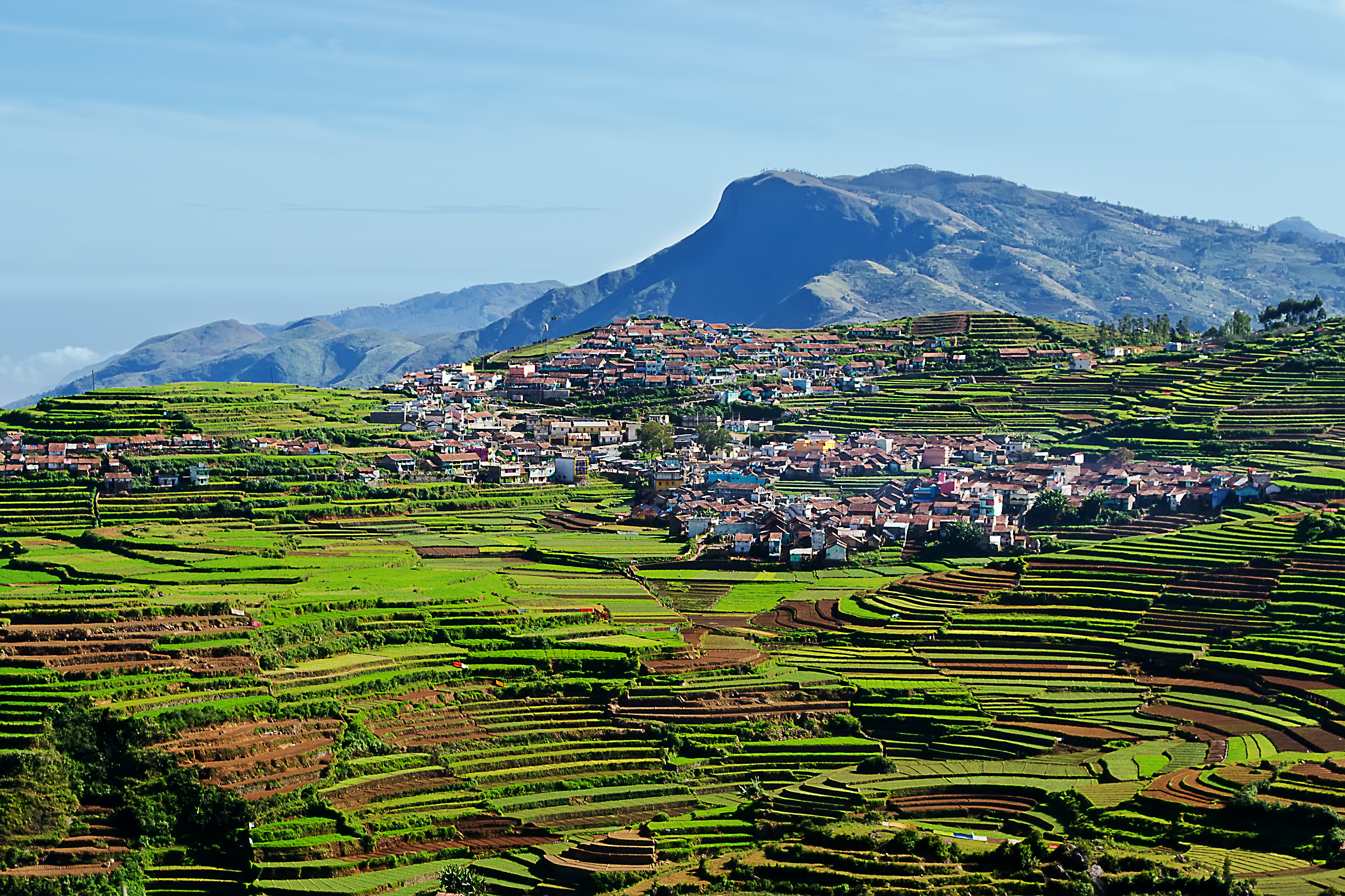
Terraced farming in Kodaikanal

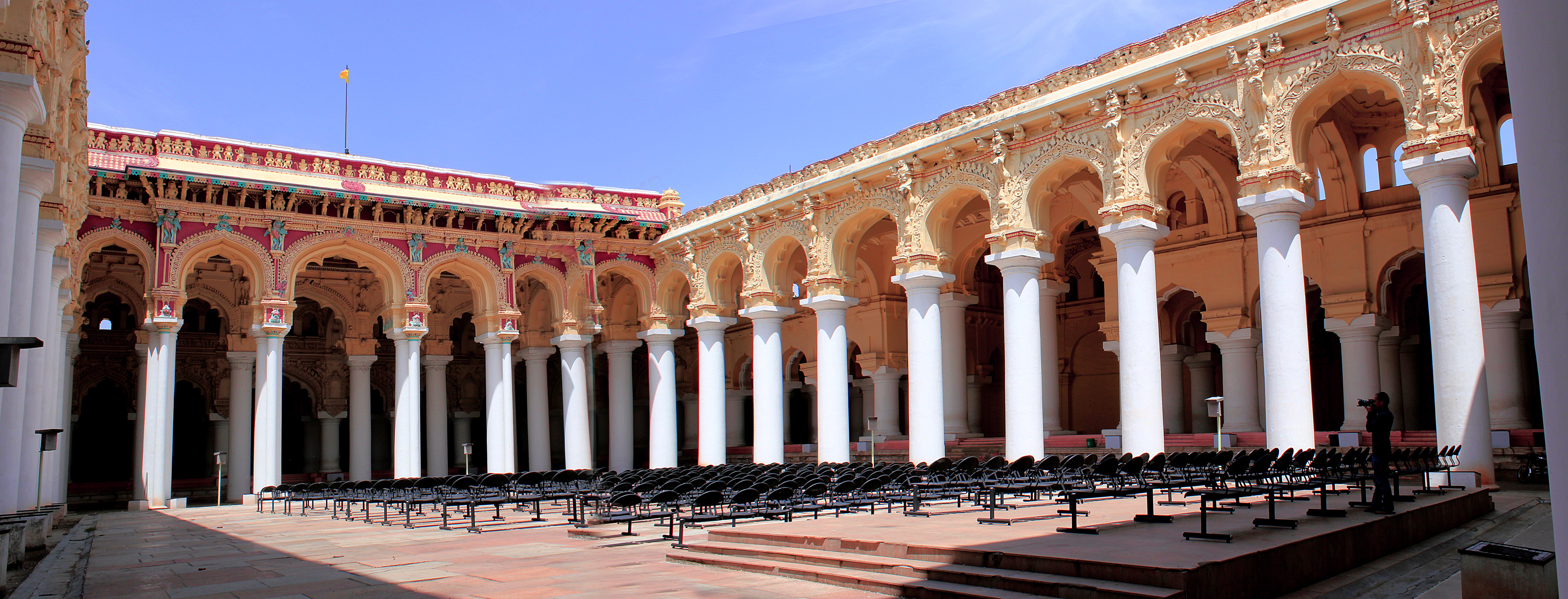
Thirumalai Nayakkar Palace at Madurai

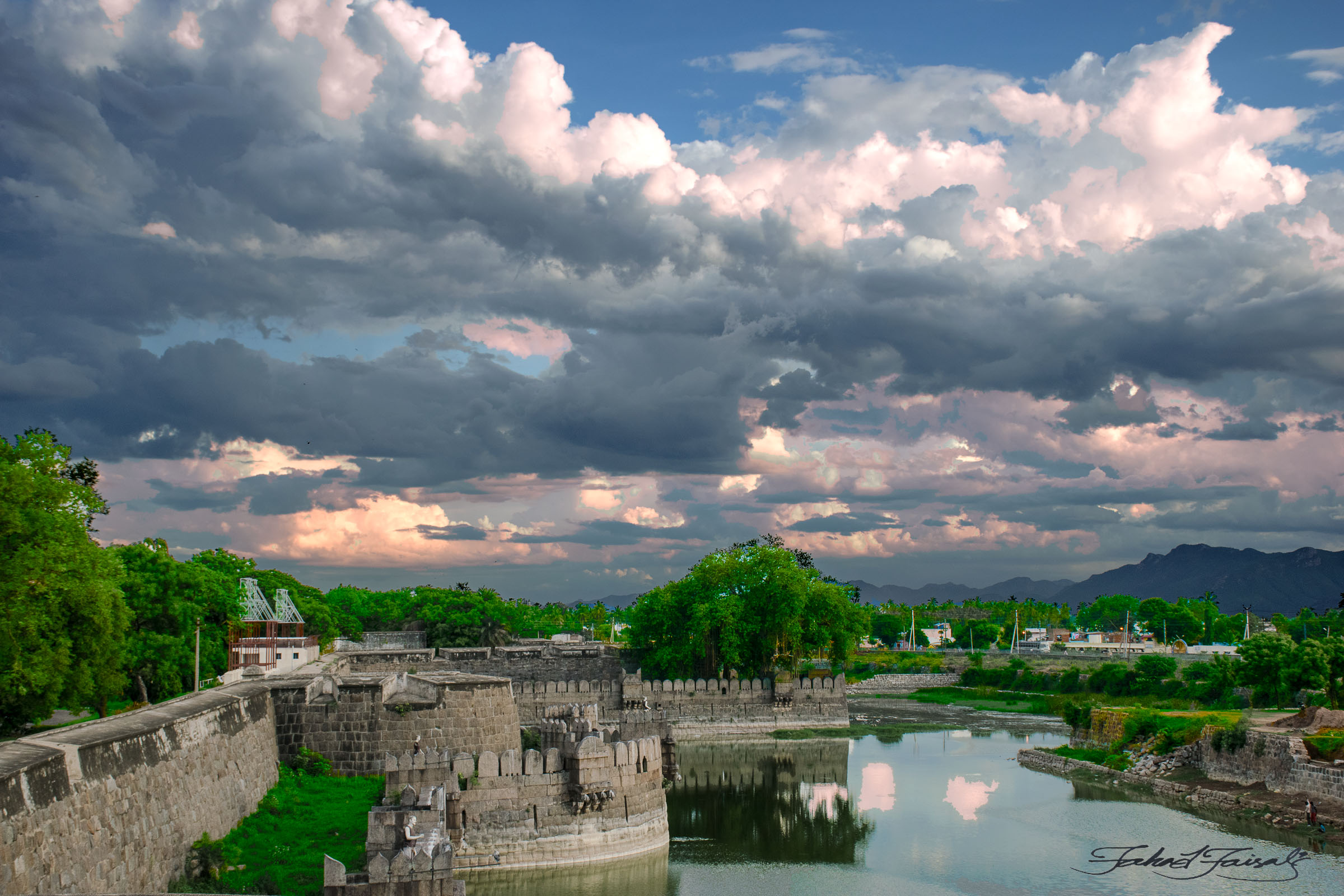
Vellore Fort

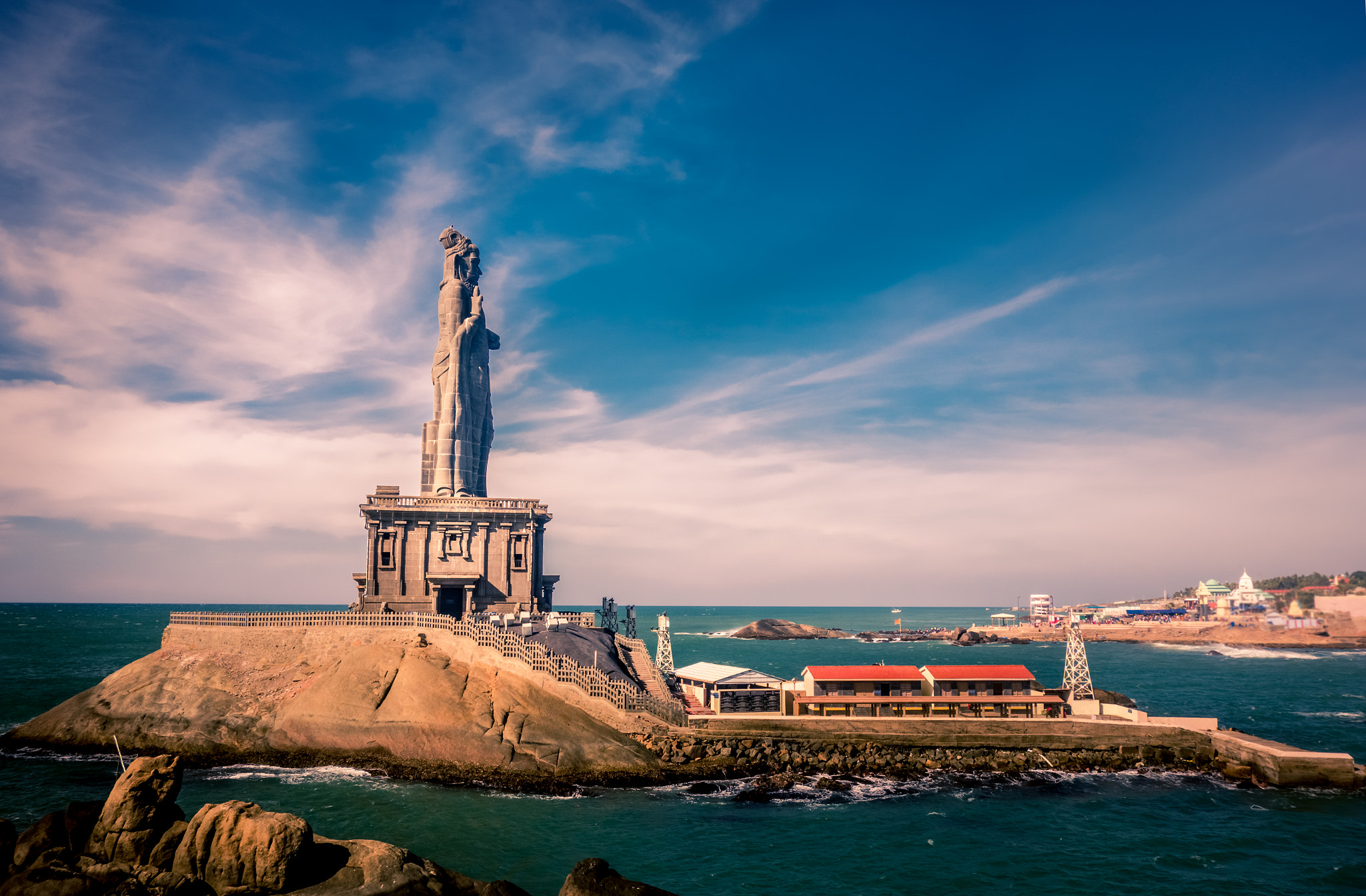
Thiruvalluvar Statue at Kanyakumari

== Telangana ==
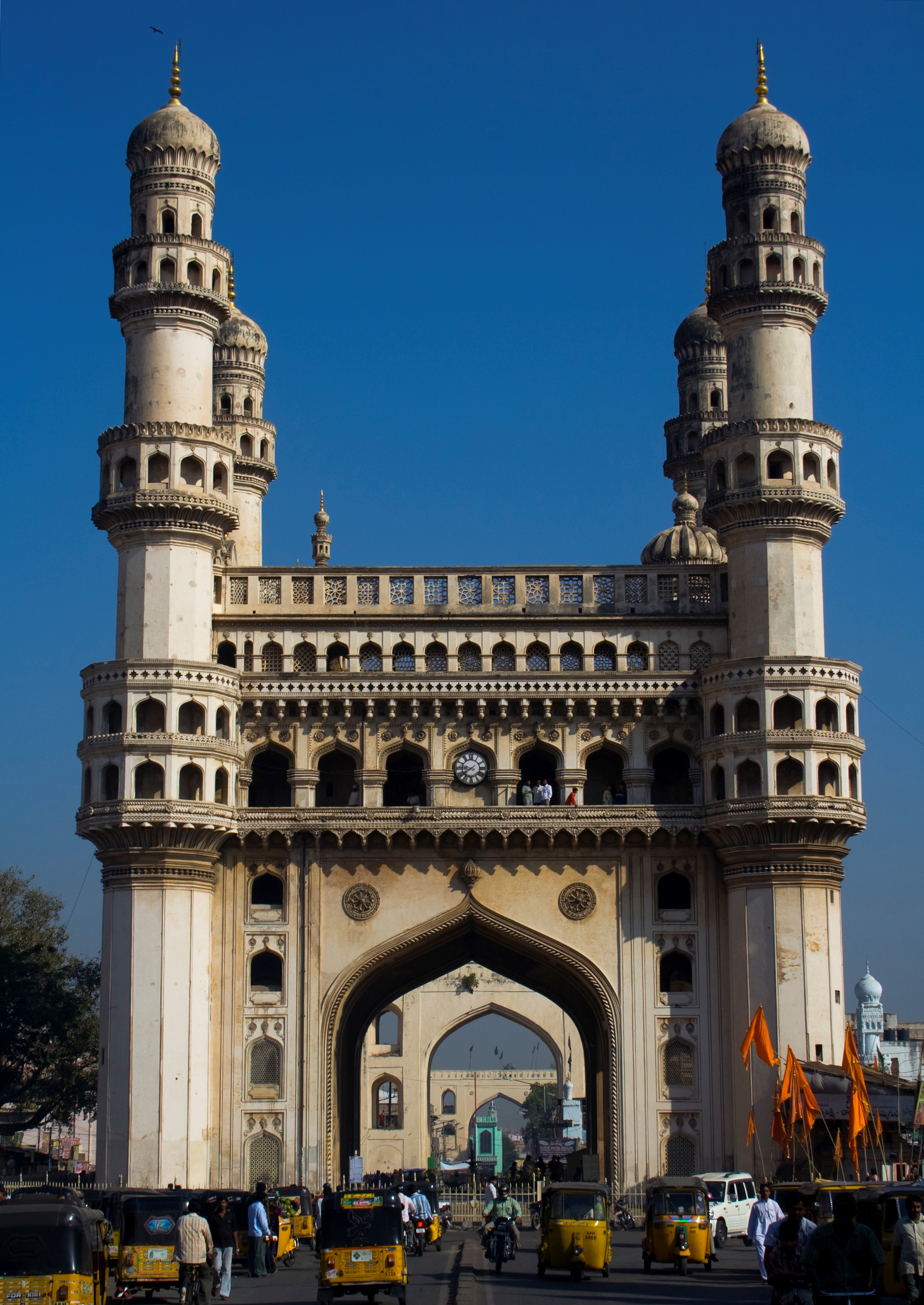
Charminar, Hyderabad

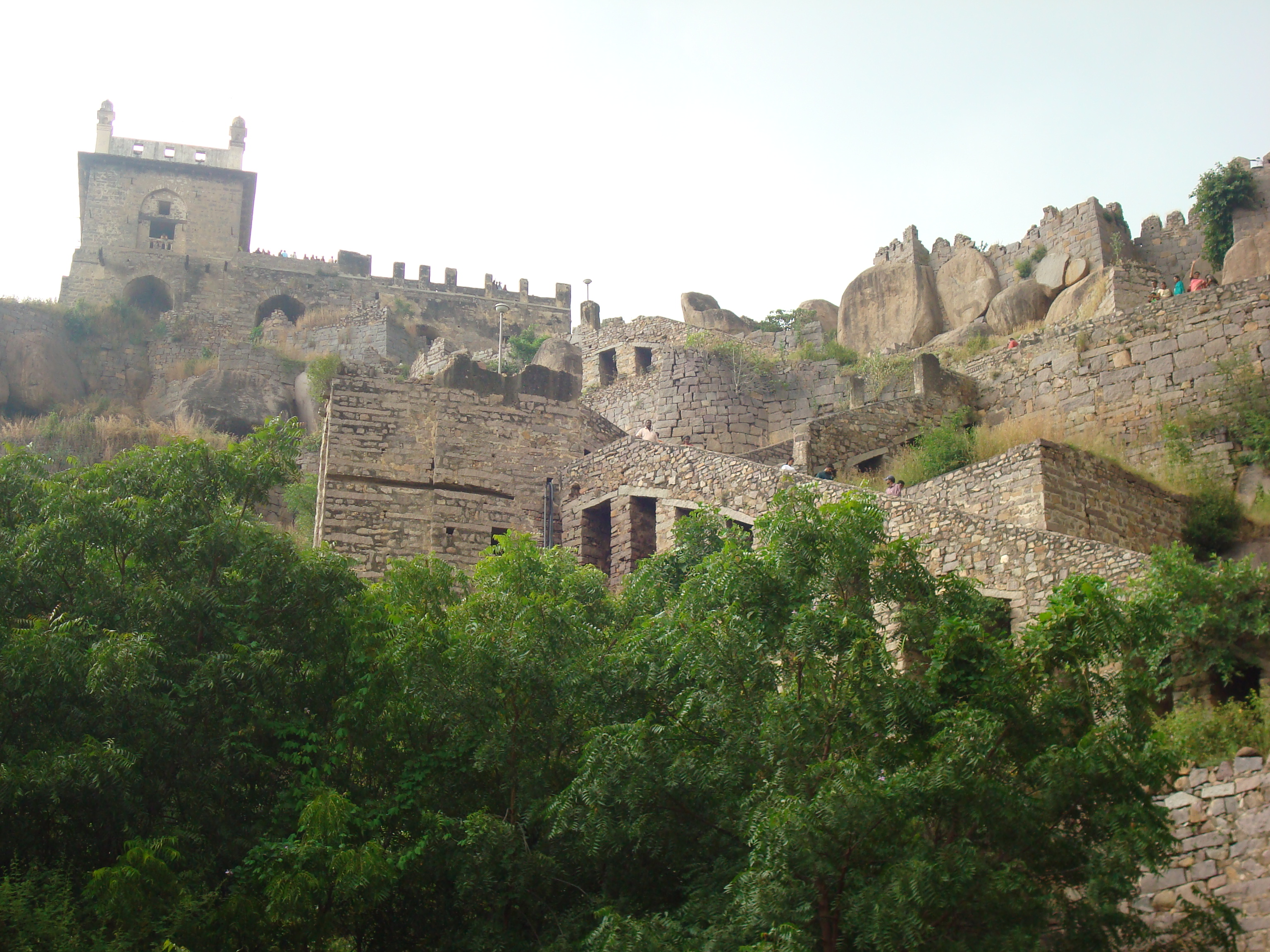
Golkonda Fort, Hyderabad

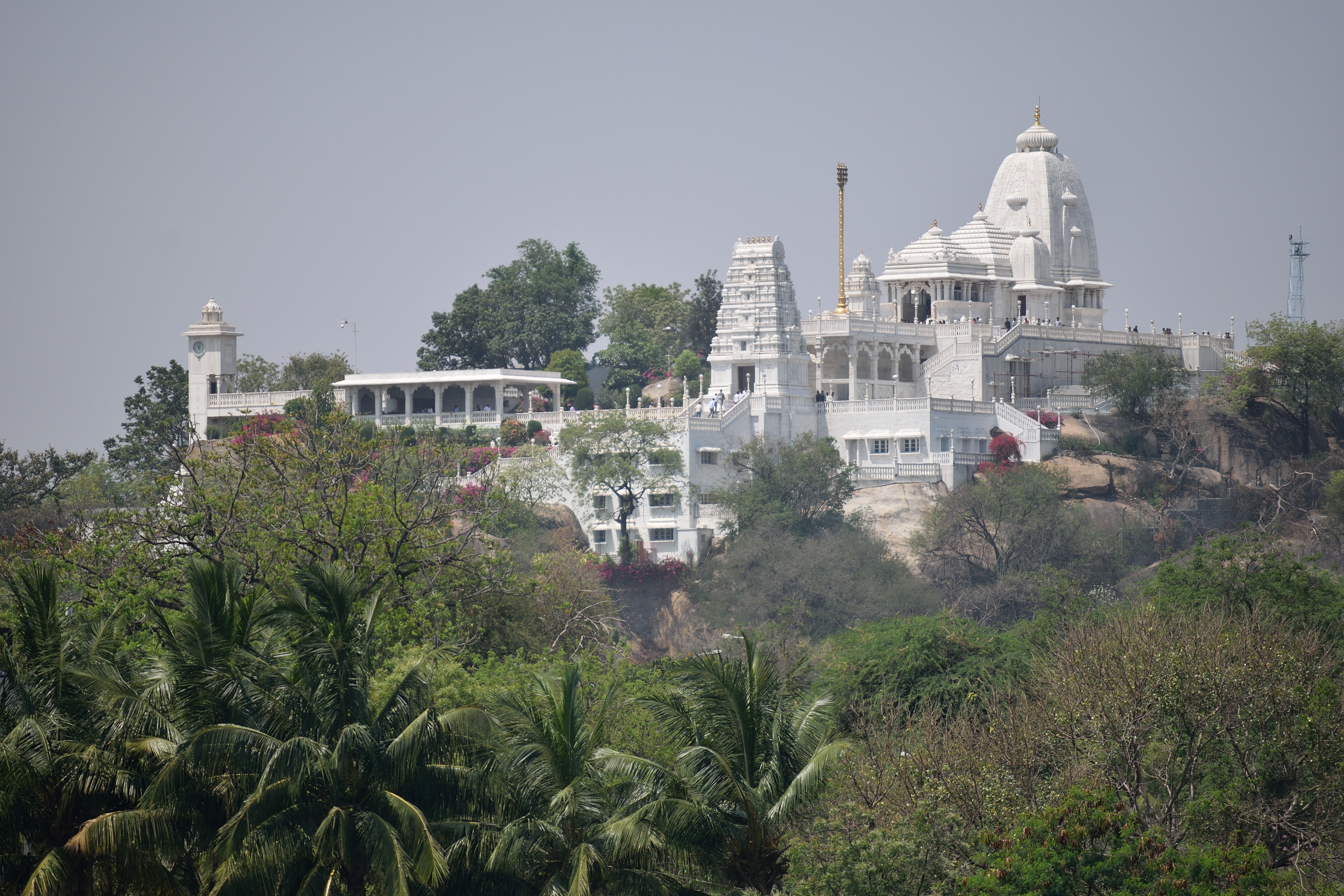
Birla Mandir, Hyderabad

Telangana features historic monuments, temples, museums, and annual festivals across the Deccan region, with a UNESCO World Heritage site at the Kakatiya Rudreshwara (Ramappa) Temple in Mulugu district.

Selected places: - Hyderabad — Charminar and nearby markets; Golkonda Fort; museums and palaces including Chowmahalla Palace and the Salar Jung Museum. - Mulugu district — Ramappa Temple (Rudreshwara), inscribed on the UNESCO World Heritage List in 2021. - Hanamkonda and Warangal — Thousand Pillar Temple and Kakatiya Kala Thoranam precincts. - Medaram — Sammakka Saralamma Jatara, a biennial tribal congregation held in the forests near Medaram. - Nirmal district — Gnana Saraswati Temple at Basar. - Rajanna Sircilla district — Rajanna (Rajarajeshwara) Temple at Vemulawada. - Yadadri Bhuvanagiri district — Yadadri Lakshmi Narasimha Temple.

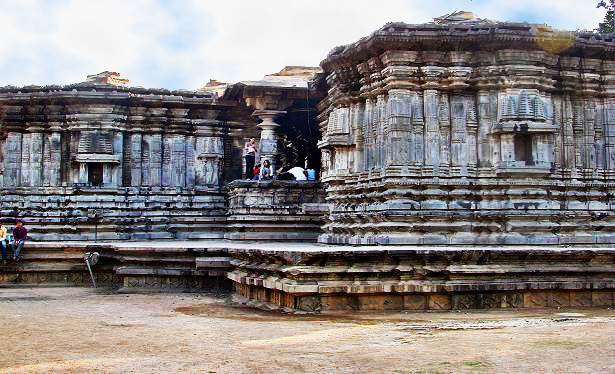
Thousand Pillar Temple at Hanamkonda

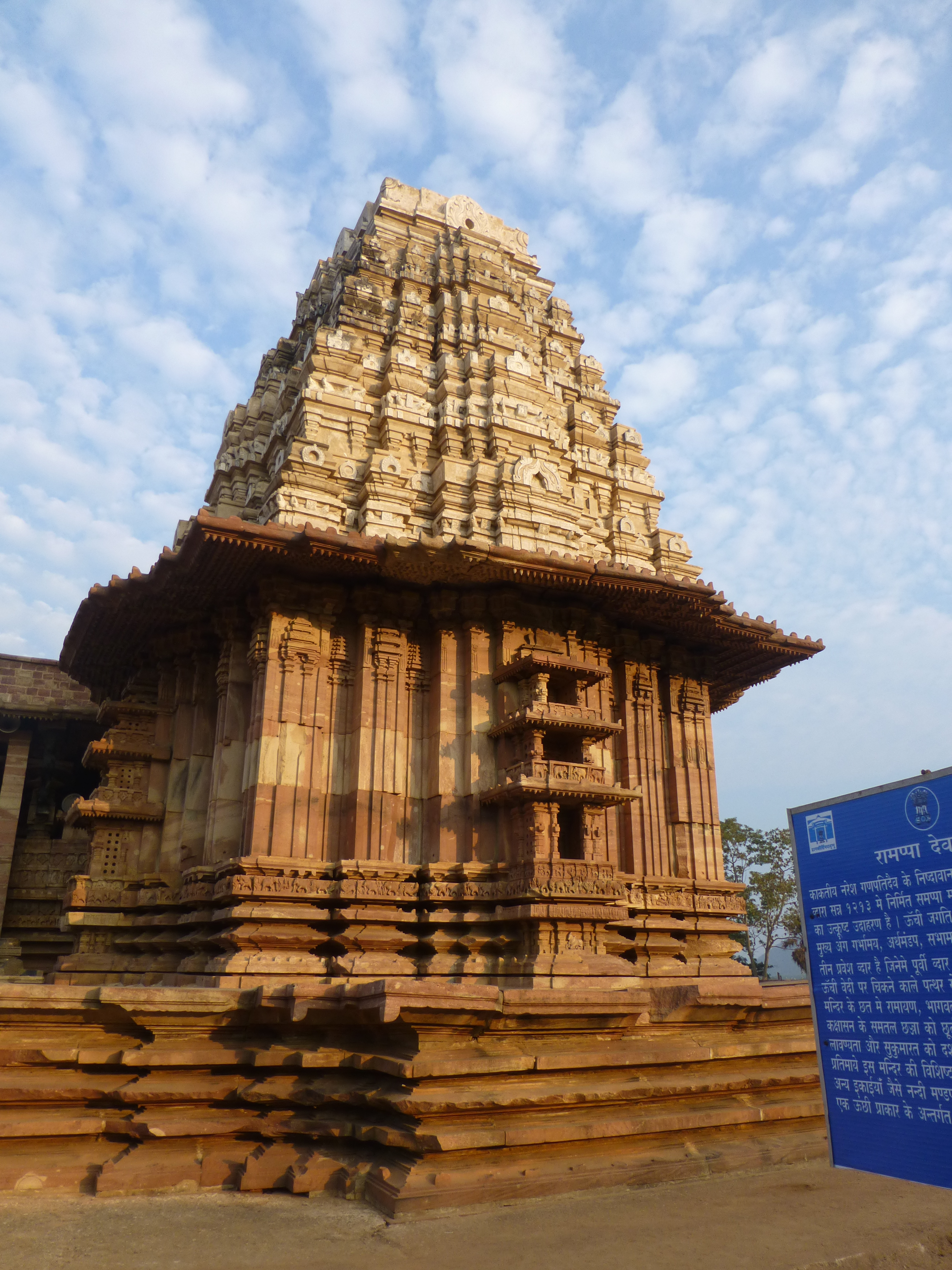
Ramappa Temple (UNESCO World Heritage Site)

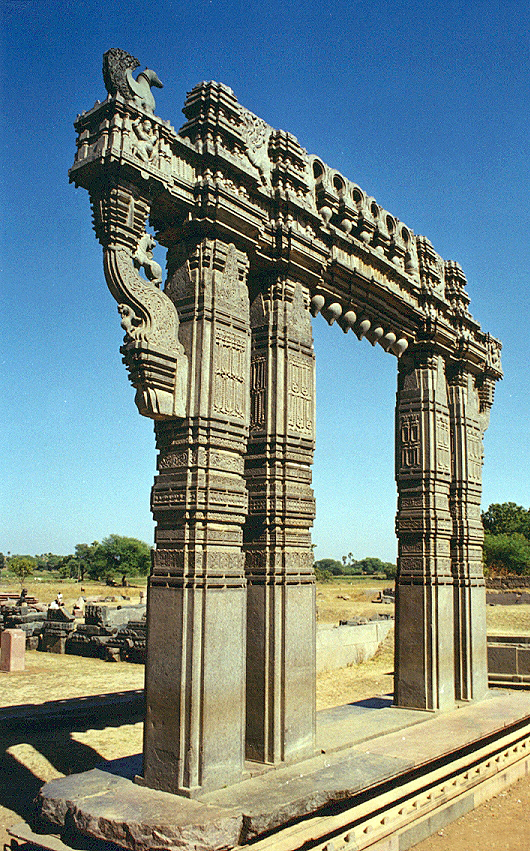
Kakatiya Kala Thoranam at Warangal Fort

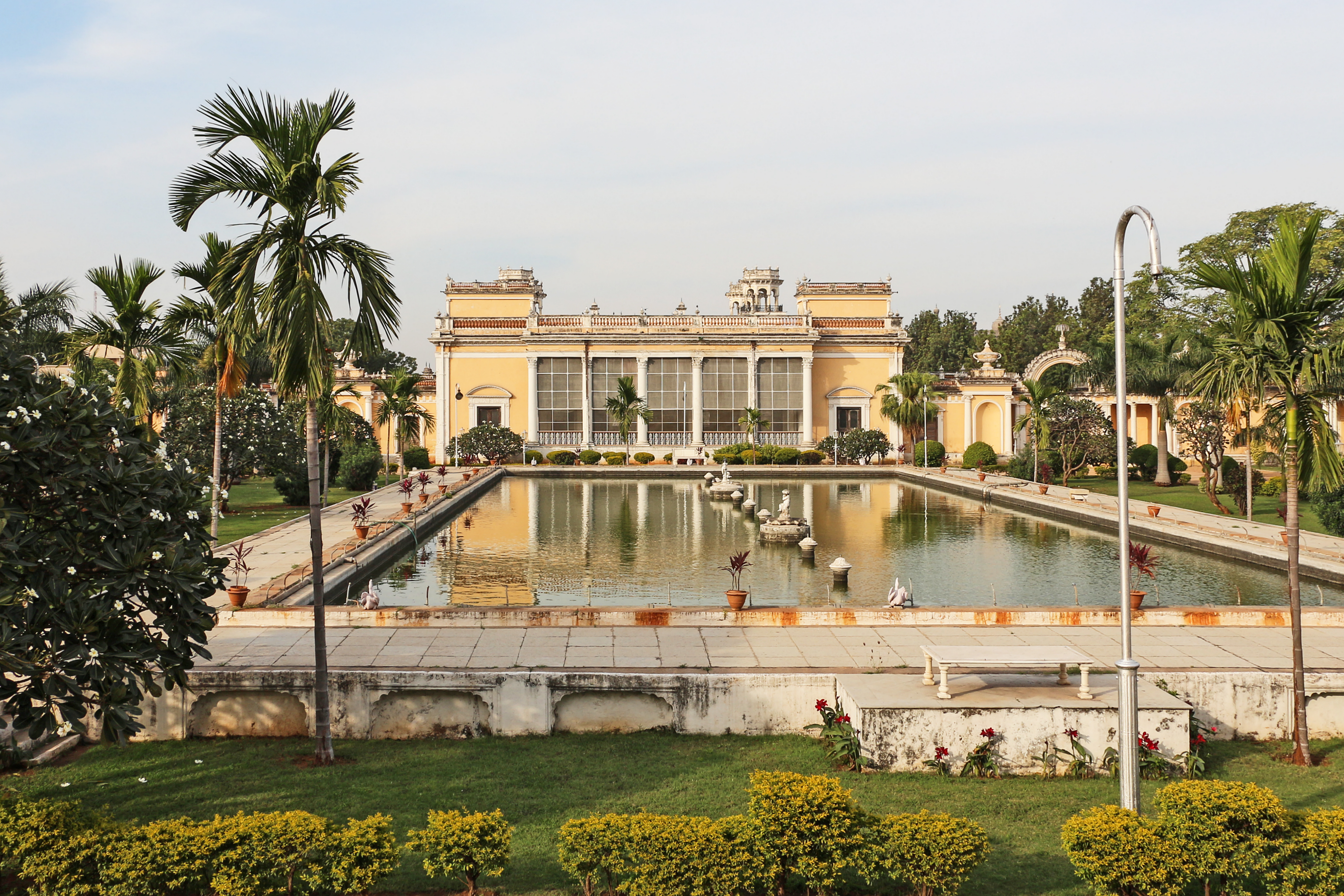
Chowmahalla Palace in Hyderabad

== Tripura ==
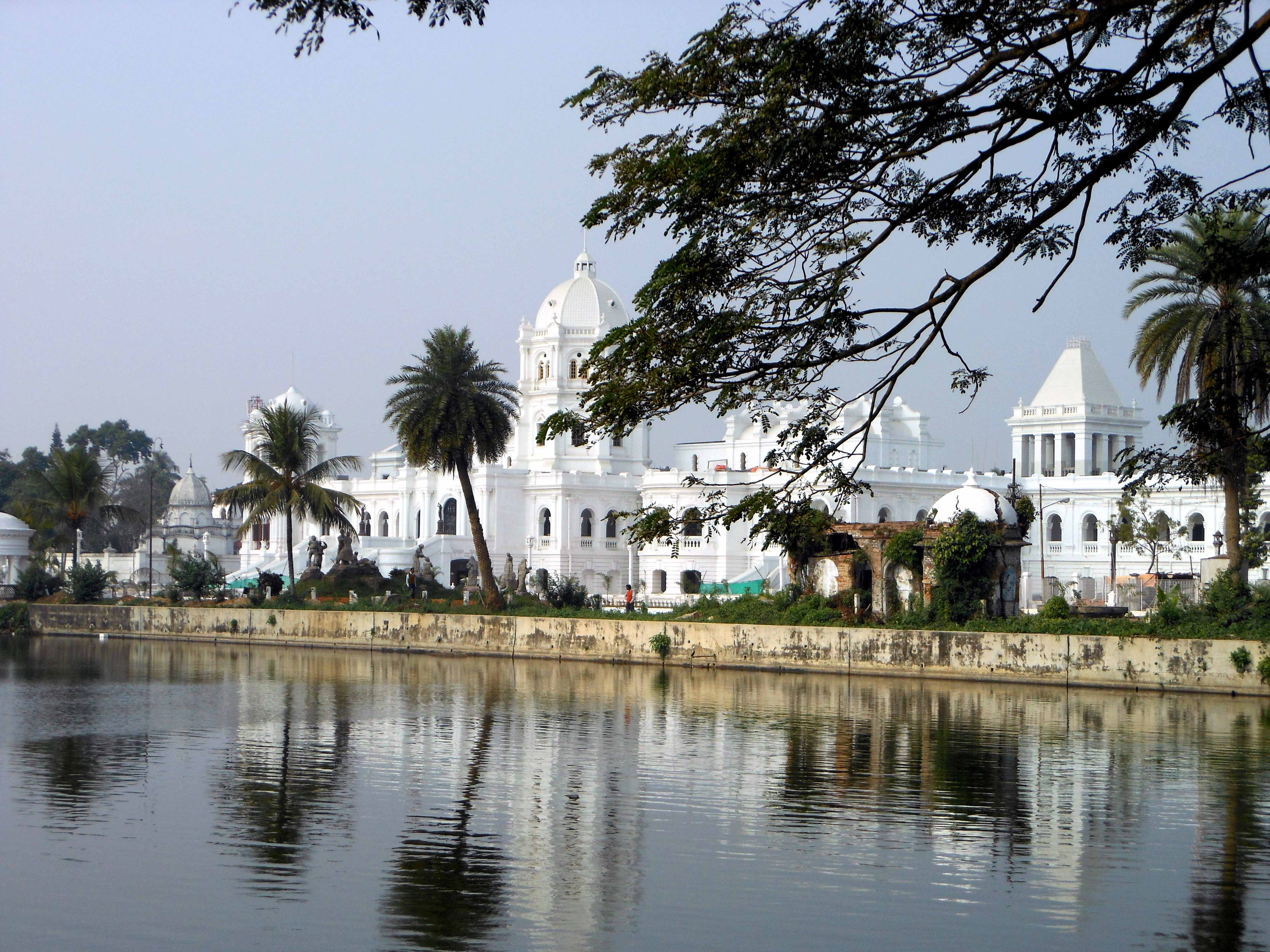
Ujjayanta Palace in Agartala

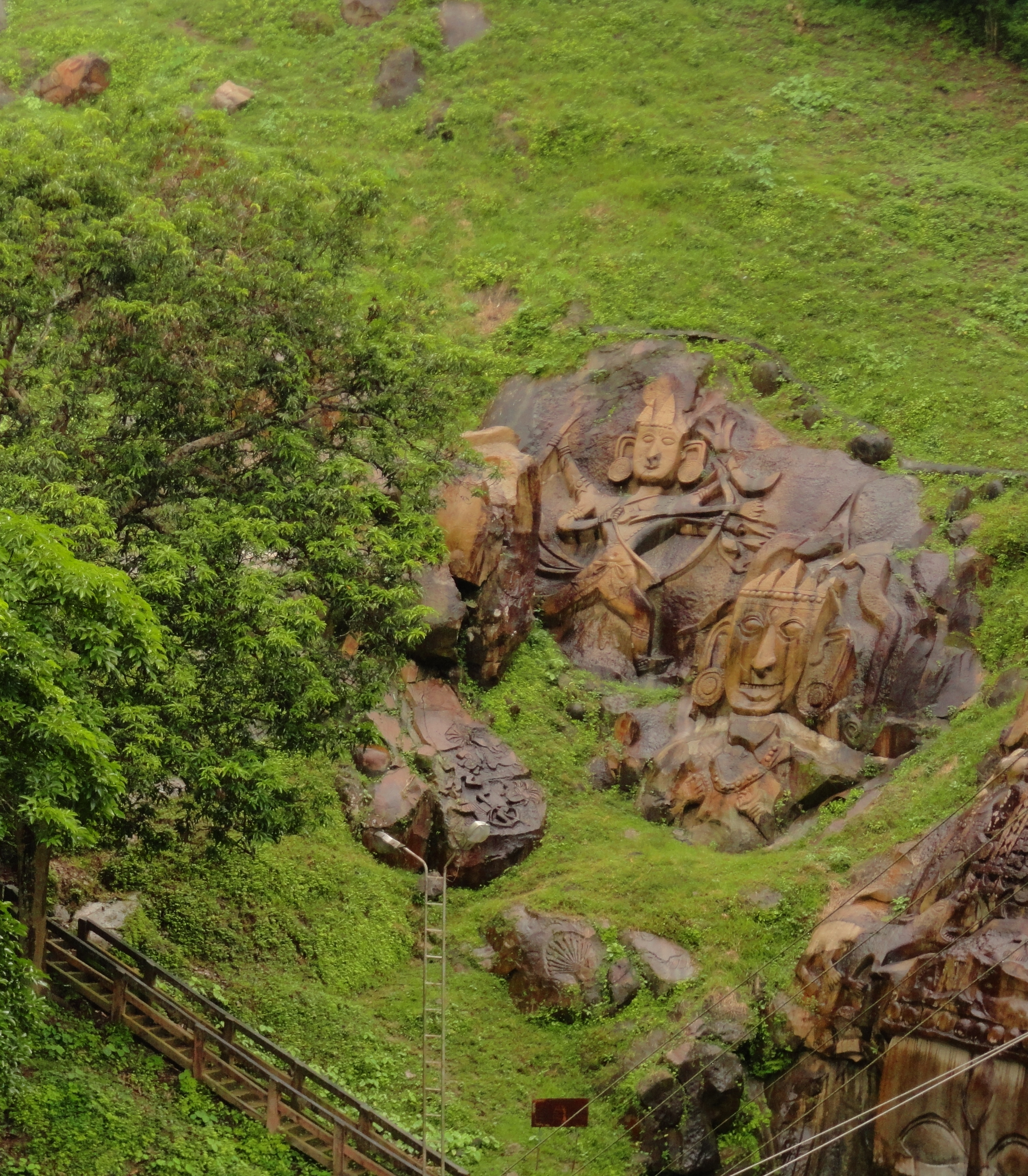
Unakoti rock-cut reliefs

Tripura features royal-era architecture, archaeological sites, and riverine hill landscapes across districts such as West Tripura, Gomati, South Tripura, and Unakoti. The former royal Ujjayanta Palace now houses the State Museum with collections on regional history, archaeology, and arts.

At Unakoti in the Unakoti district, large rock-cut sculptures and reliefs on a forested hillside are a noted pilgrimage and heritage landscape; the site was added to India's UNESCO Tentative List in 2022.

Other places: - Bhubaneswari Temple (Udaipur, Gomati) — 17th‑century temple patronized by Maharaja Govinda Manikya, located by the Gomati River; associated with literary references by Rabindranath Tagore. - Chabimura (Gomati) — river‑bank cliffs with panels of rock carvings depicting deities, accessible by boat from Amarpur and Udaipur. - Pilak (South Tripura) — archaeological zone with Hindu–Buddhist remains from about the 8th to 12th centuries; antiquities from Pilak are displayed at the State Museum, Agartala. - Boxanagar (West Tripura) — ASI excavations have revealed a brick stupa, chaityagriha, and monastery indicating a Buddhist establishment dating to about the 8th century CE or later.

== Uttarakhand ==
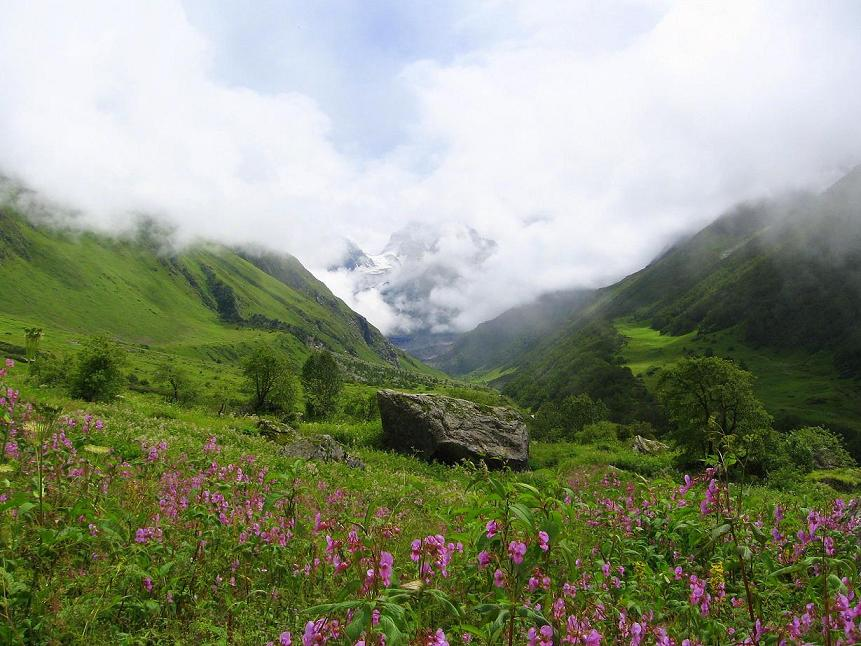
Nanda Devi and Valley of Flowers National Parks, a UNESCO World Heritage property

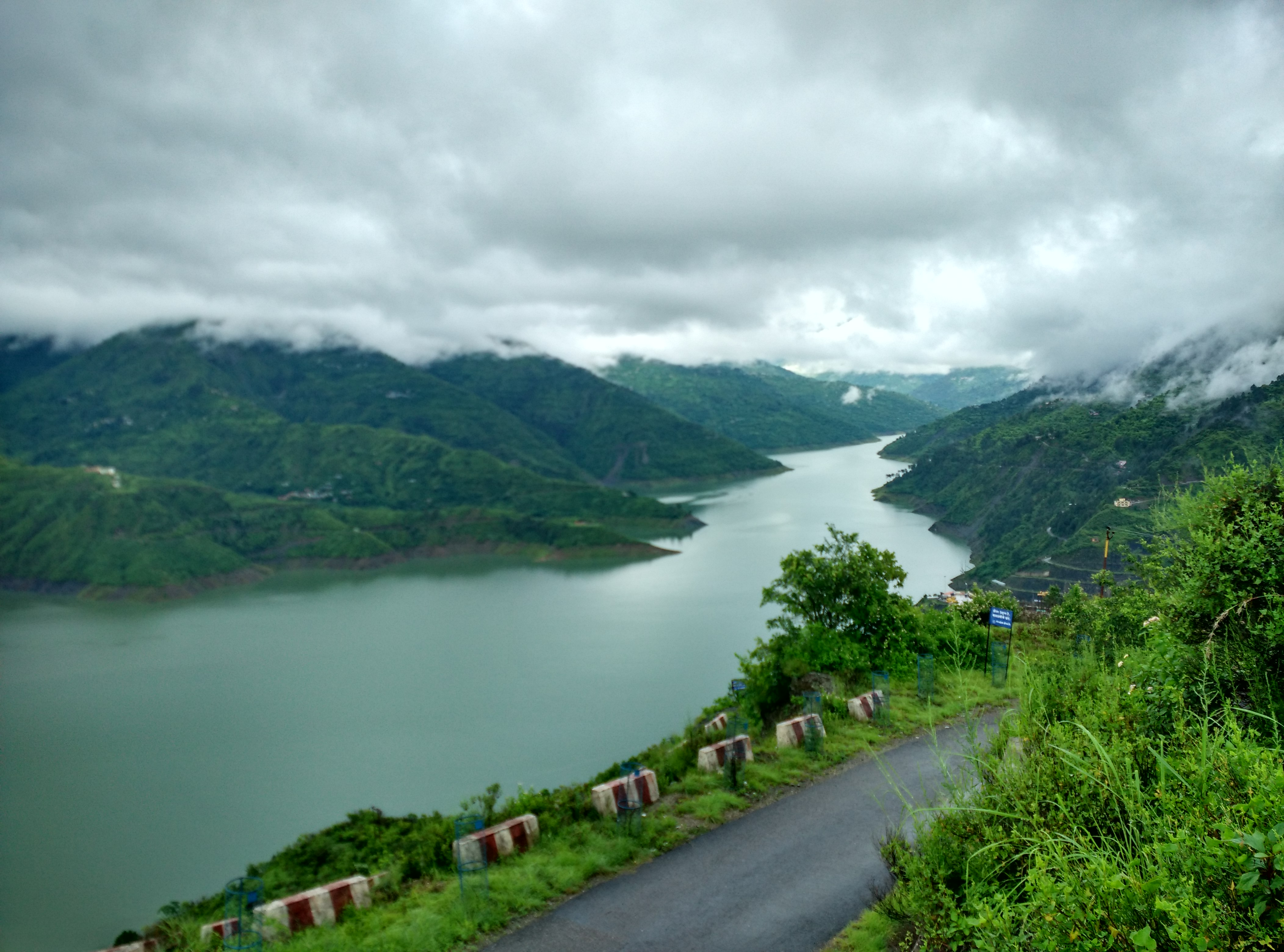
Tehri Lake near New Tehri

Uttarakhand is a Himalayan state noted for protected mountain landscapes and pilgrimage centres; the combined Nanda Devi and Valley of Flowers National Parks is inscribed on the UNESCO World Heritage List.

The Char Dham pilgrimage circuit comprises Badrinath, Kedarnath, Gangotri, and Yamunotri, with official registration and yatra information provided by the state portal.

Major protected areas include Corbett Tiger Reserve and Rajaji Tiger Reserve; the Asan Conservation Reserve near Dehradun is designated a Ramsar wetland.

Adventure activities include skiing at Auli and water sports at Tehri Lake, featured by state and district tourism resources.

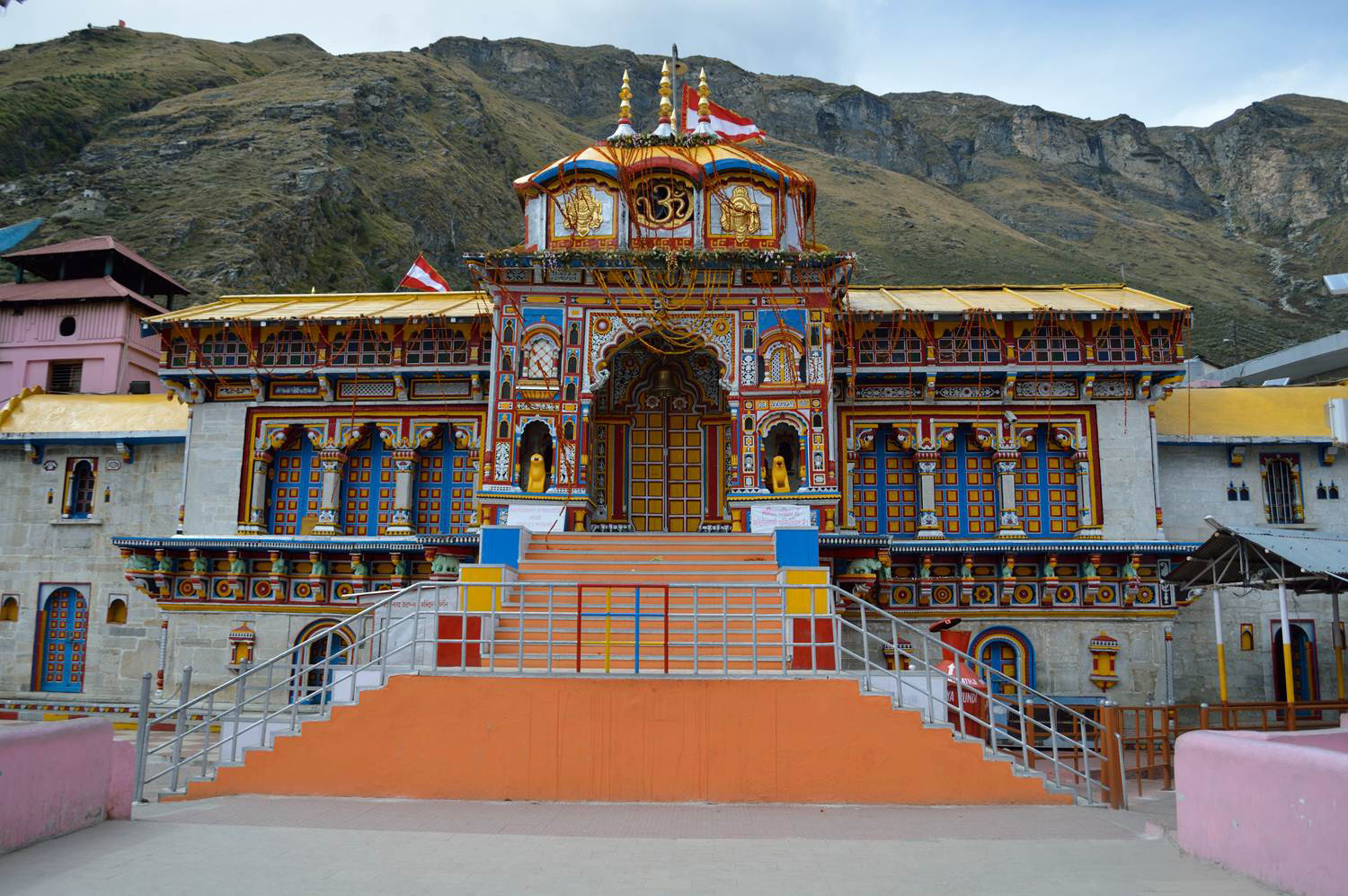
Badrinath Temple

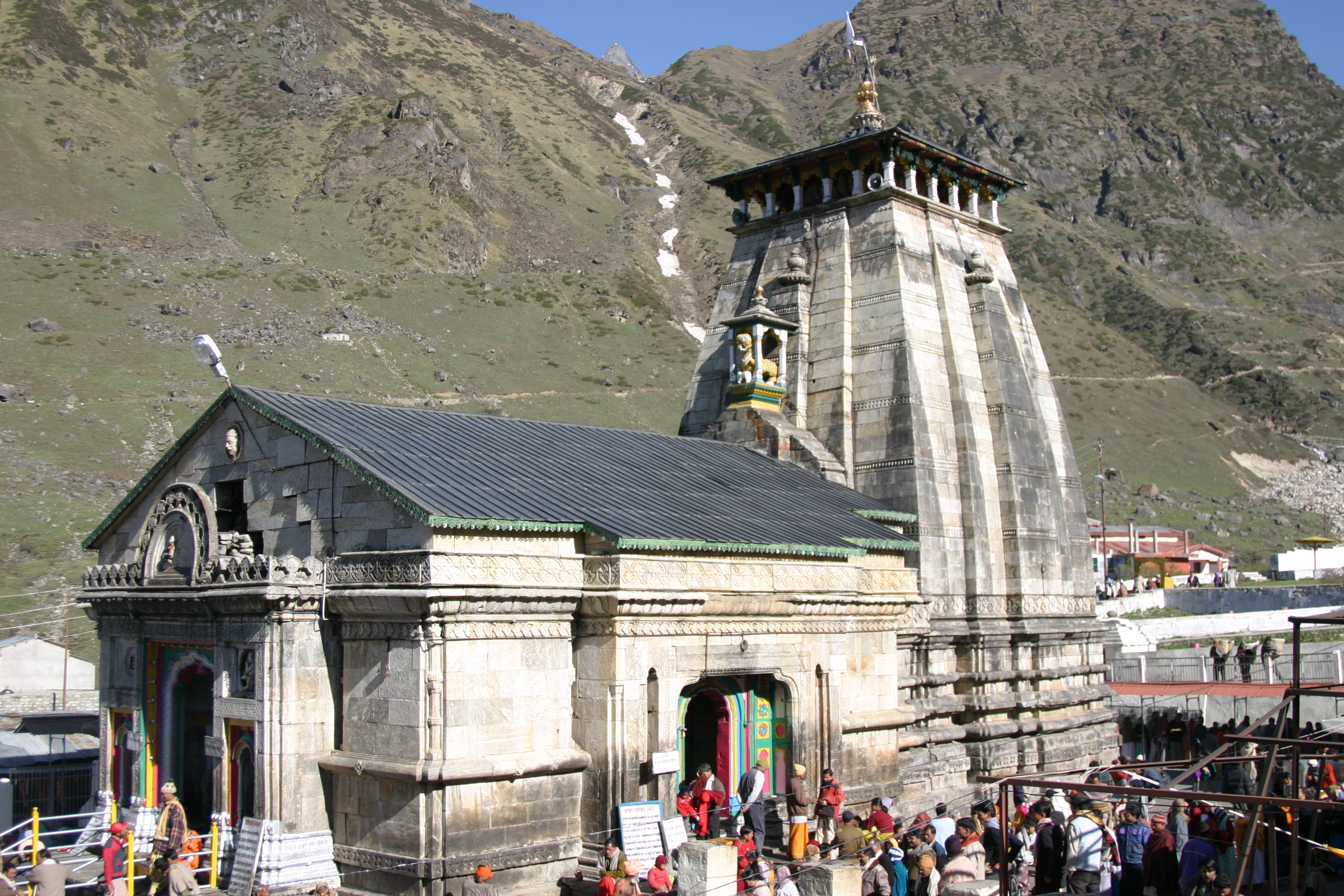
Kedarnath Temple

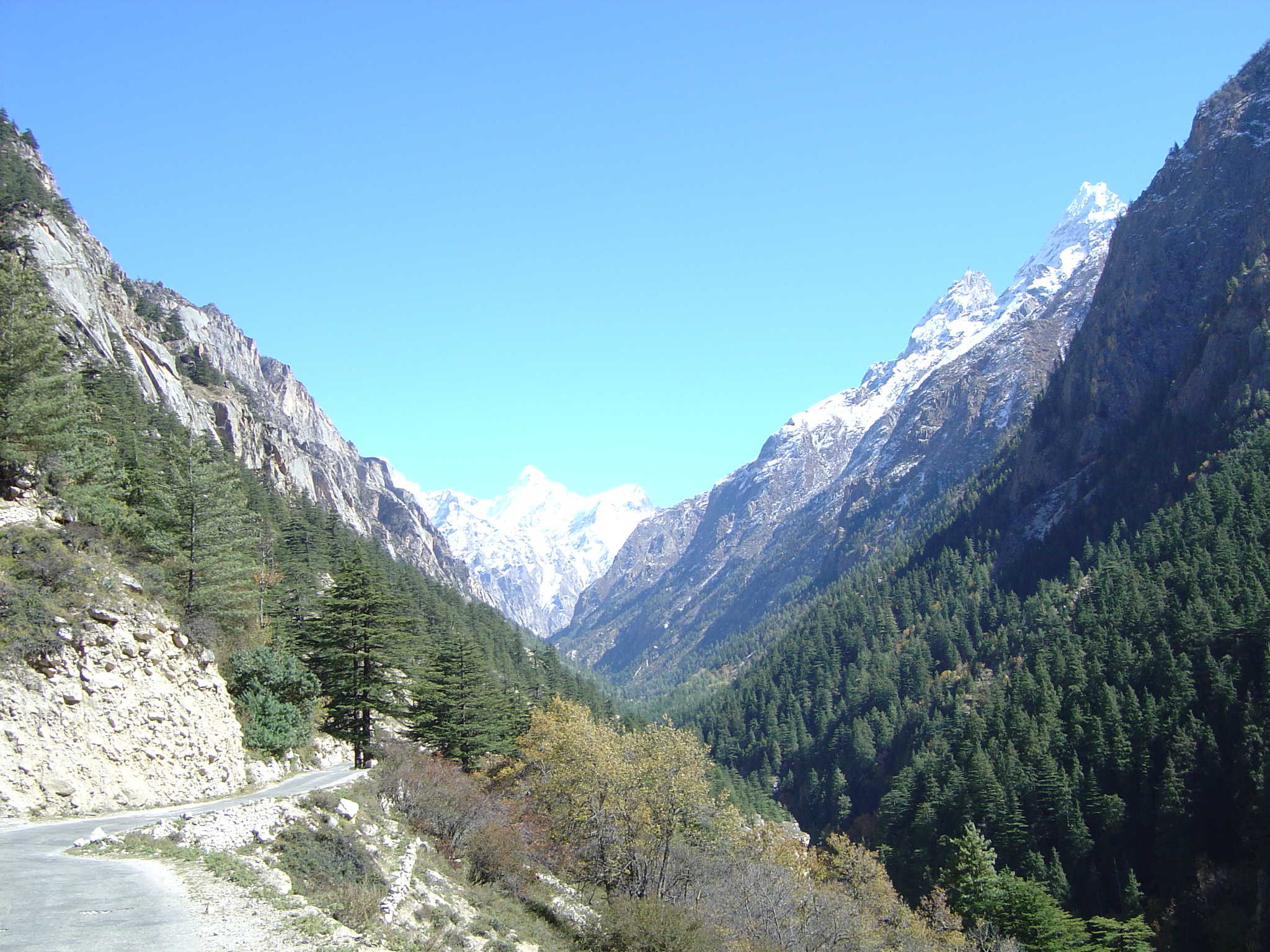
Gangotri

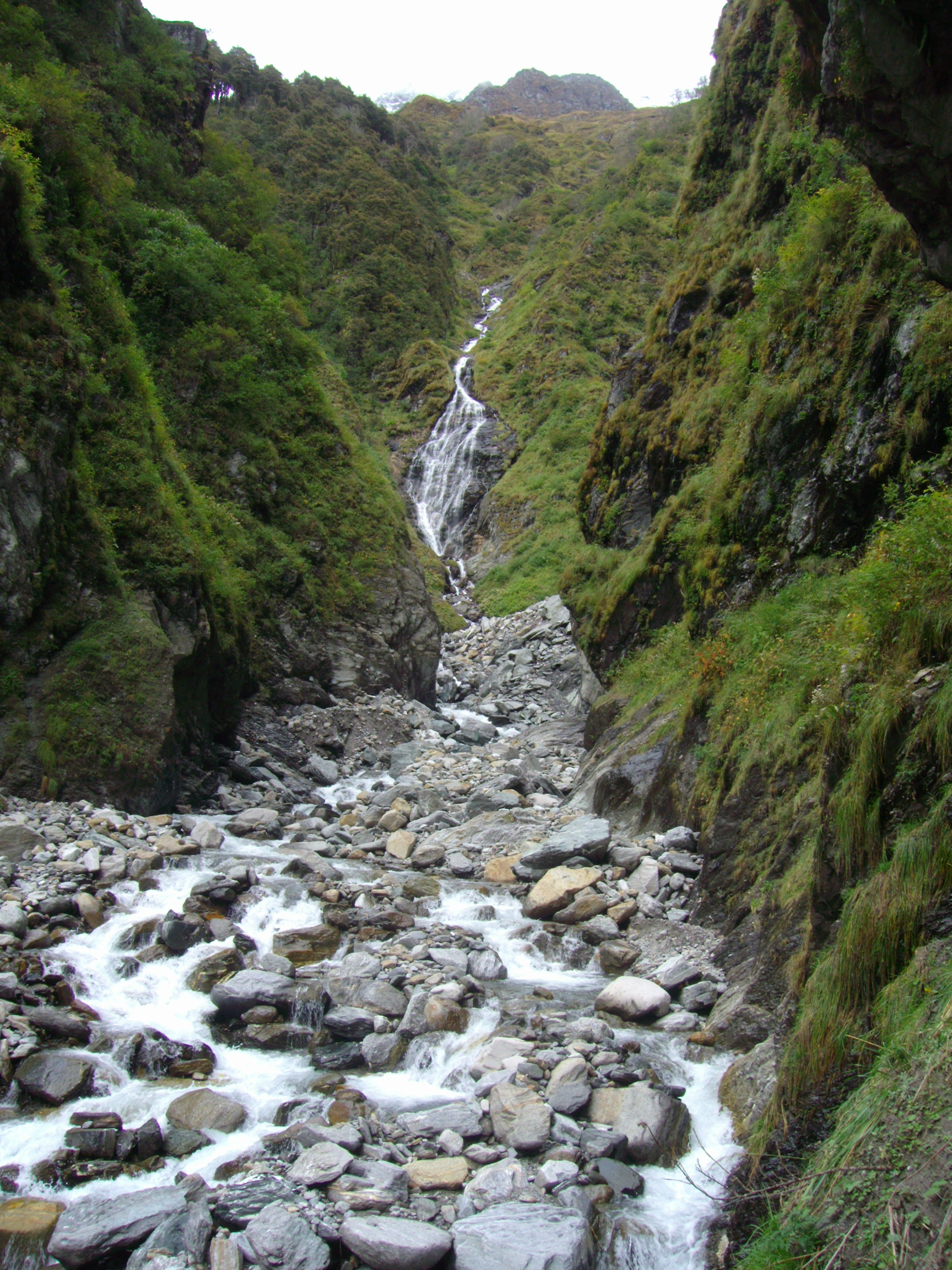
Yamunotri

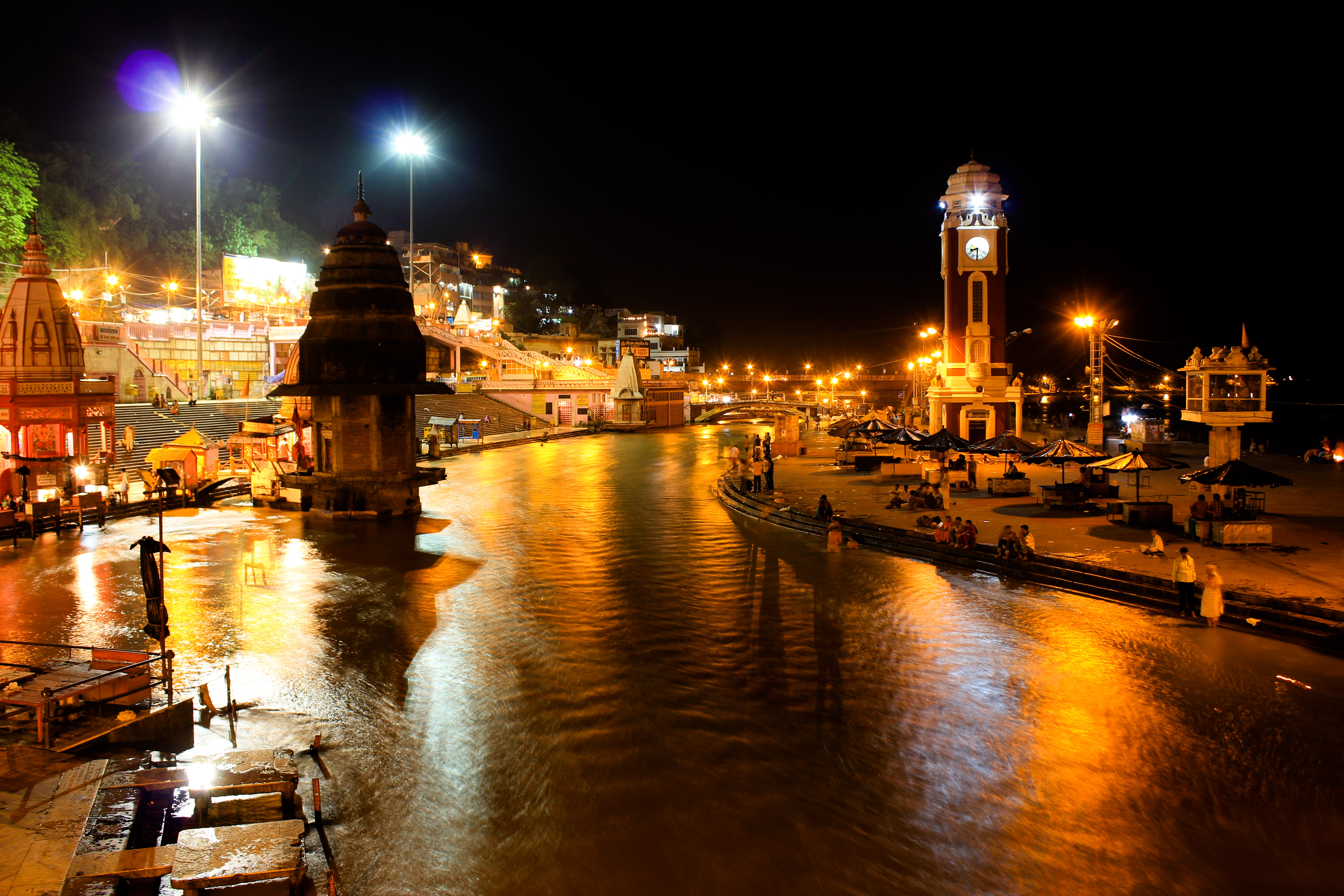
Ganga at Haridwar

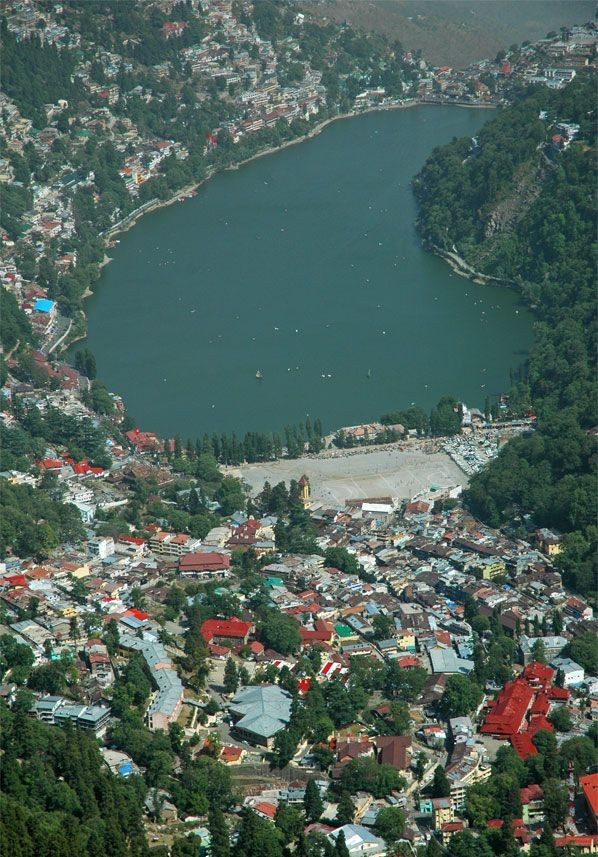
Nainital, a hill station in Kumaon

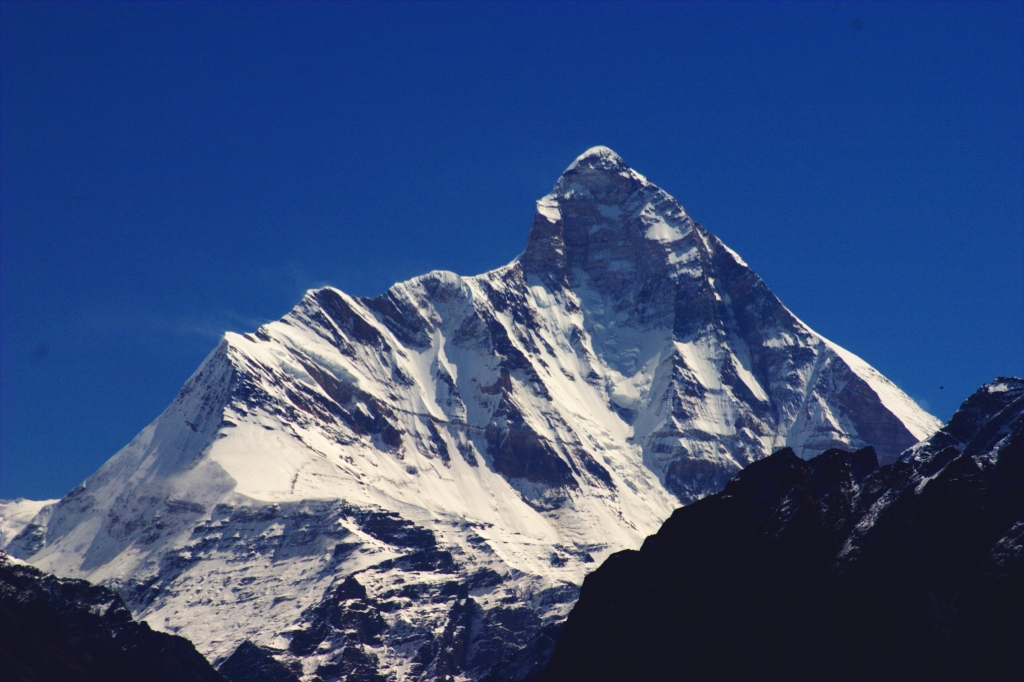
Nanda Devi in the UNESCO World Heritage property

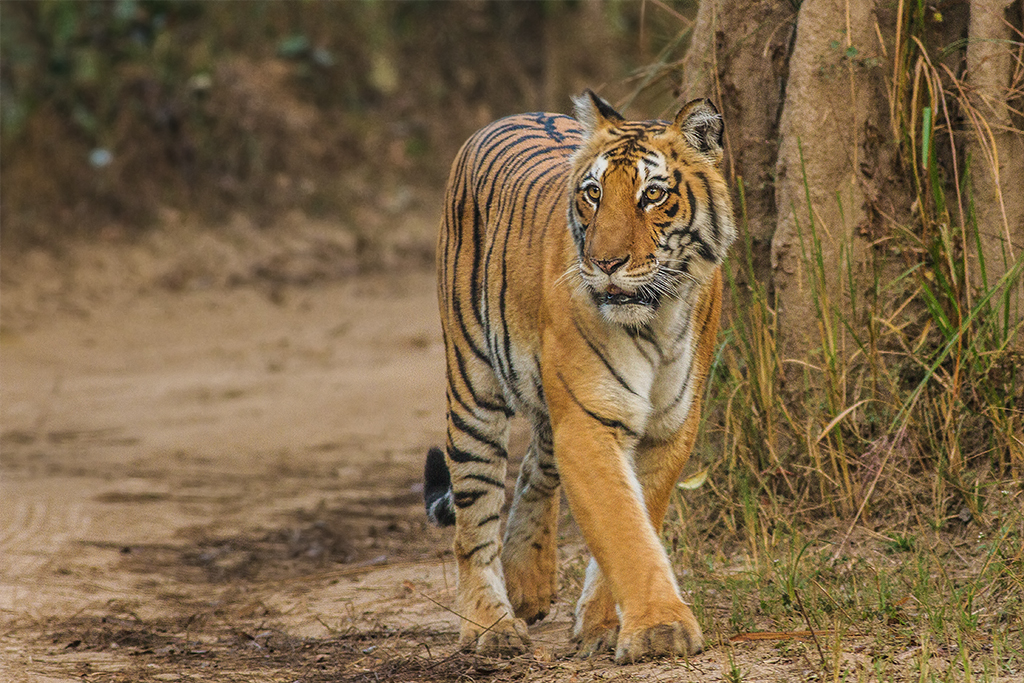
Corbett Tiger Reserve

== Uttar Pradesh ==
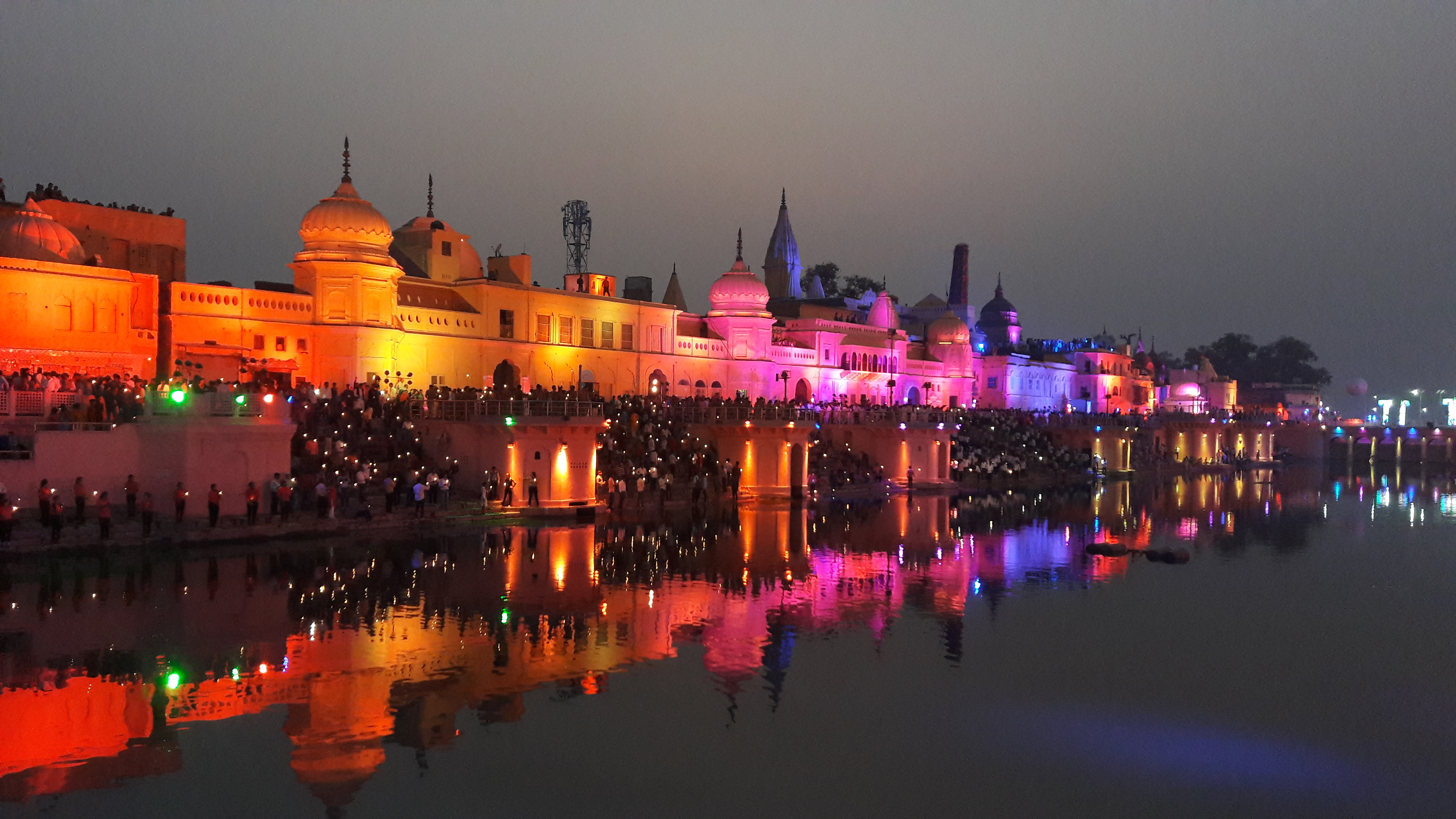
Ayodhya on the Saryu River

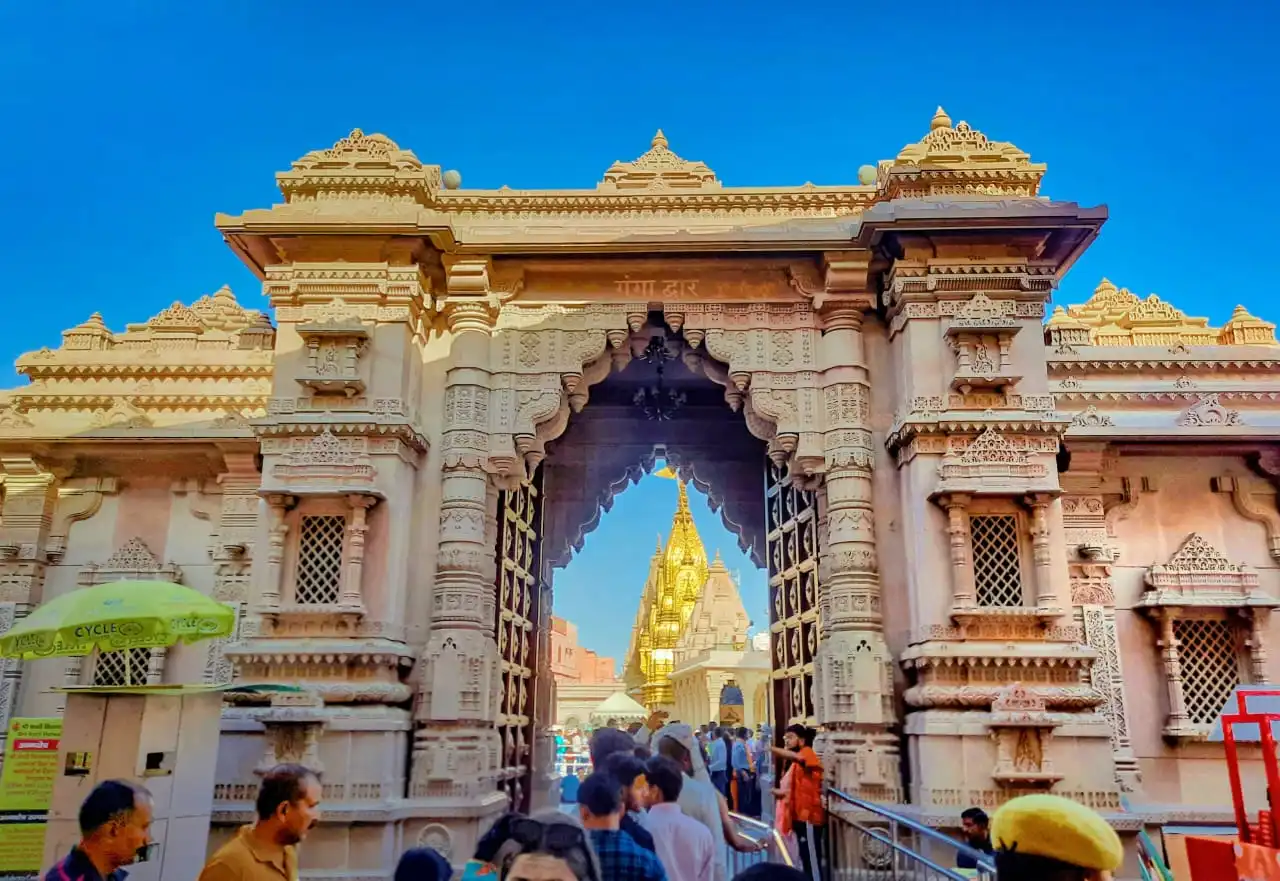
Kashi Vishwanath Temple precinct in Varanasi

Uttar Pradesh is a northern Indian state known for UNESCO-listed Mughal heritage in Agra and major pilgrimage centers such as Varanasi and Ayodhya, drawing visitors for architecture, riverfront ghats, and museums. The Kumbh Mela held at Prayagraj is inscribed on UNESCO's Representative List of the Intangible Cultural Heritage of Humanity.

Selected places: - Agra — Three UNESCO World Heritage properties: the Taj Mahal, Agra Fort, and Fatehpur Sikri. - Varanasi — Historic ghats on the Ganga and temple traditions including the Kashi Vishwanath precinct and nearby Sarnath. - Ayodhya — Pilgrimage city on the Saryu, noted among the seven sacred cities in several traditions. - Prayagraj — Site of the Kumbh and Ardh Kumbh gatherings recognized by UNESCO as intangible cultural heritage. - Sarnath — ASI site museum and archaeological park associated with early Buddhist heritage near Varanasi. - Kushinagar — Major Buddhist pilgrimage center associated with the Mahaparinirvana of the Buddha. - Dudhwa National Park — Terai ecosystem with tiger reserve landscapes in Lakhimpur Kheri district. - Pilibhit Tiger Reserve — International award-winning reserve area for doubling the tiger population before the targeted time.

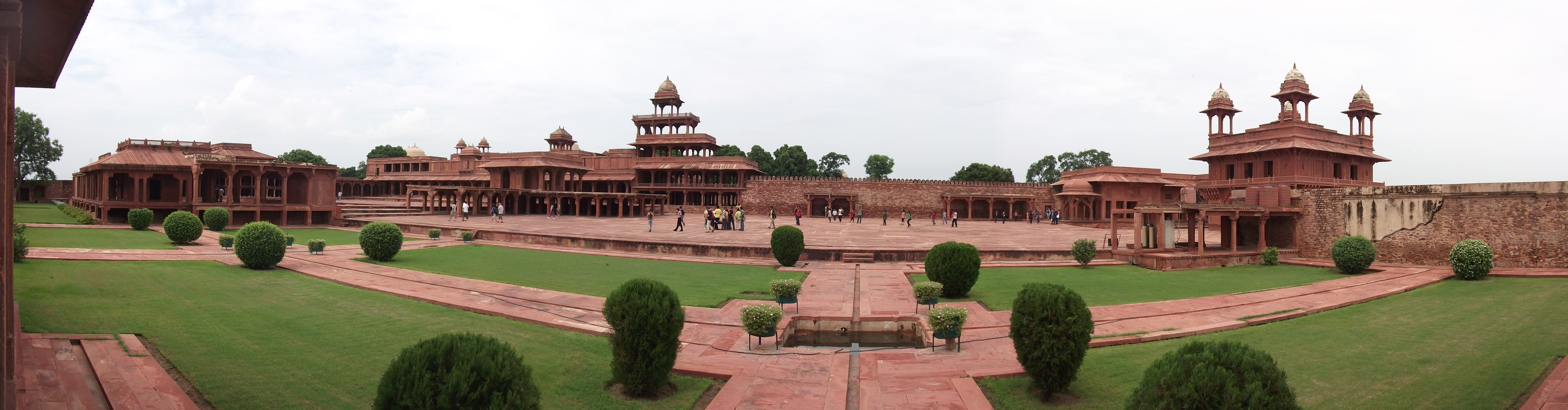
Fatehpur Sikri (UNESCO World Heritage Site)

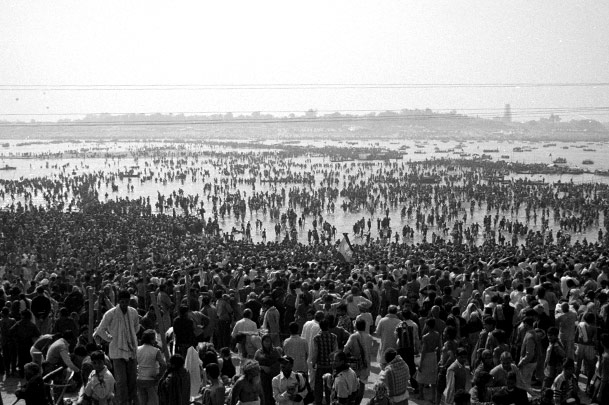
Kumbh Mela at Prayagraj (UNESCO Intangible Cultural Heritage)

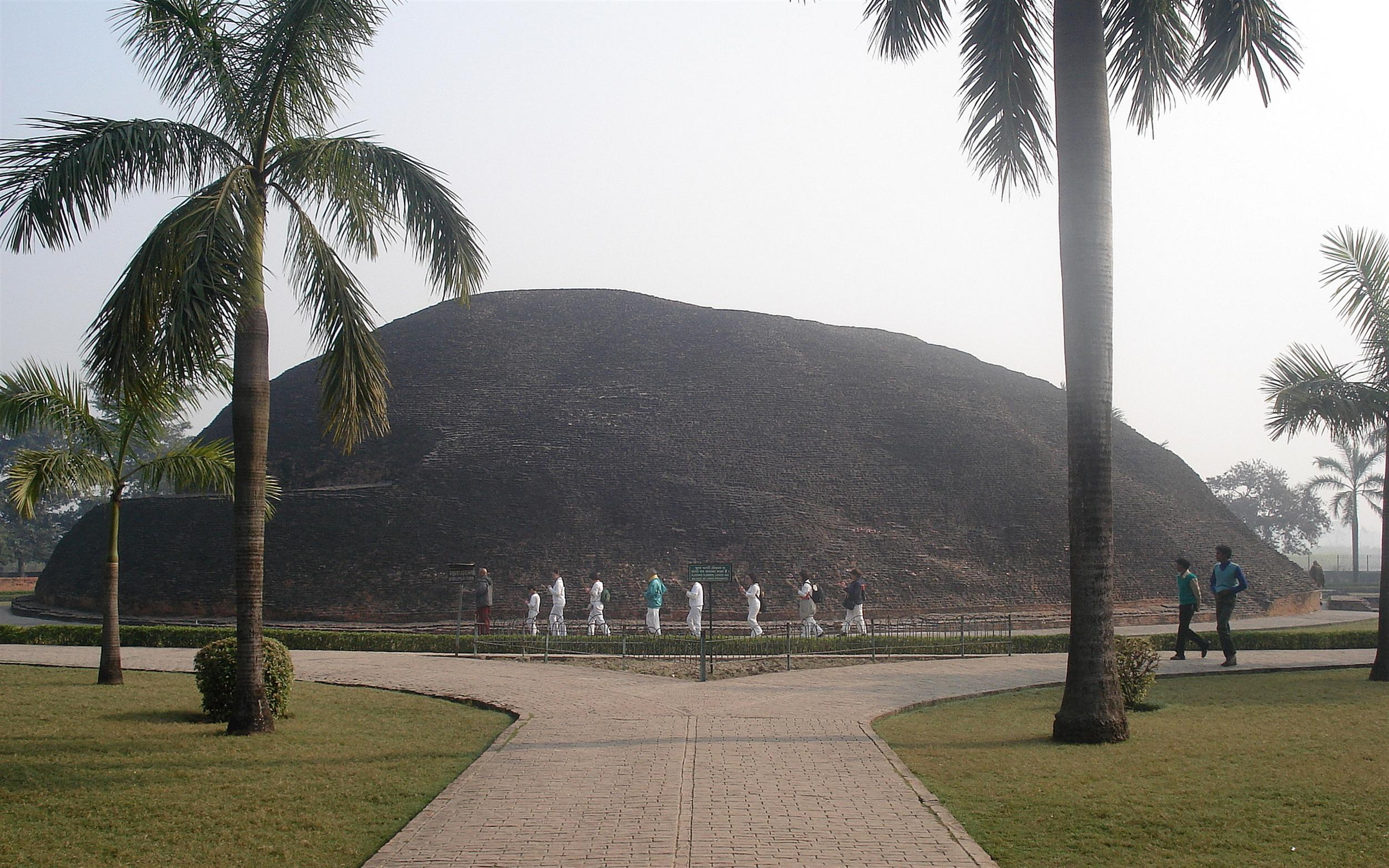
Kushinagar (Buddhist pilgrimage center)

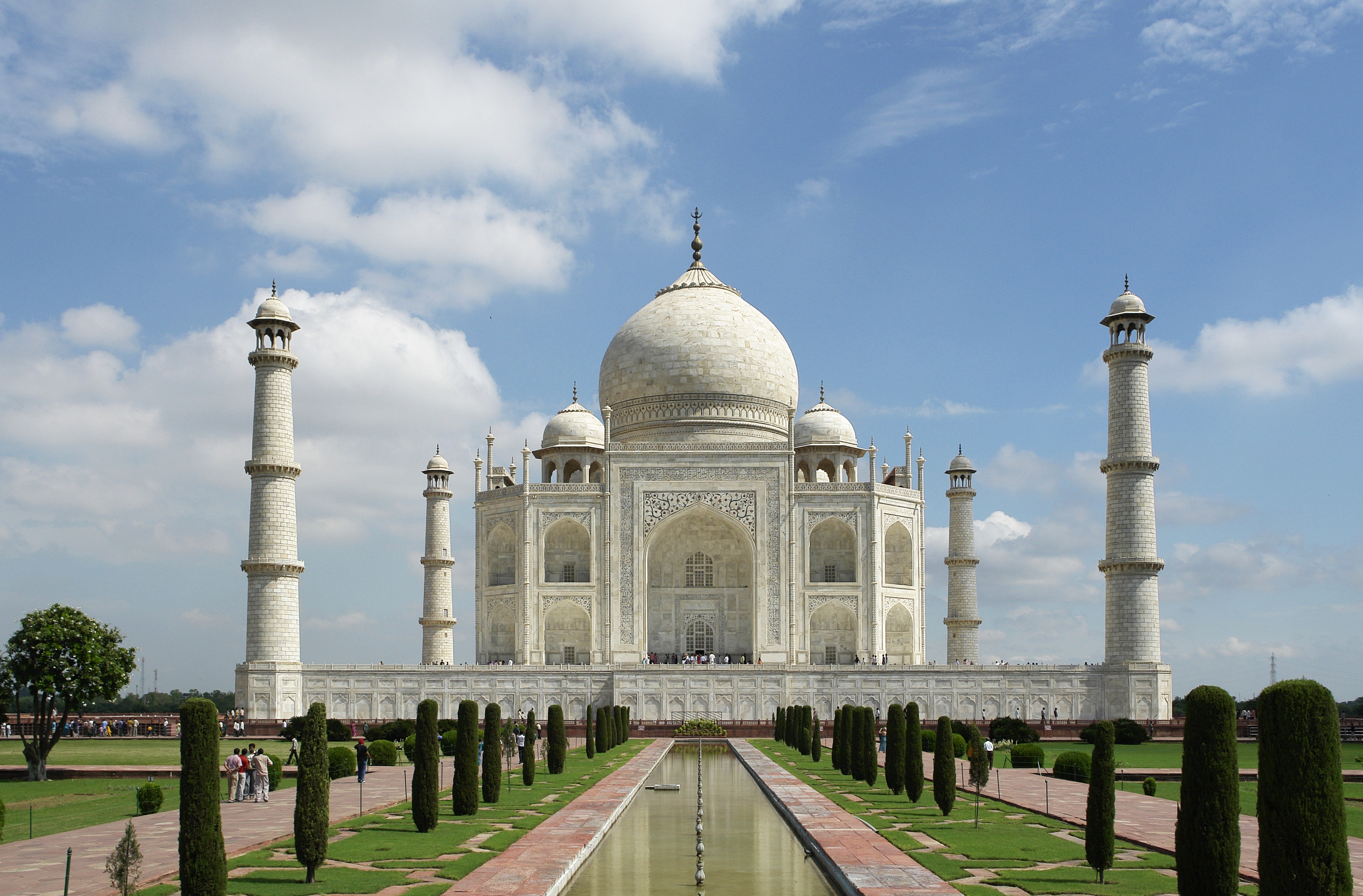
Taj Mahal in Agra

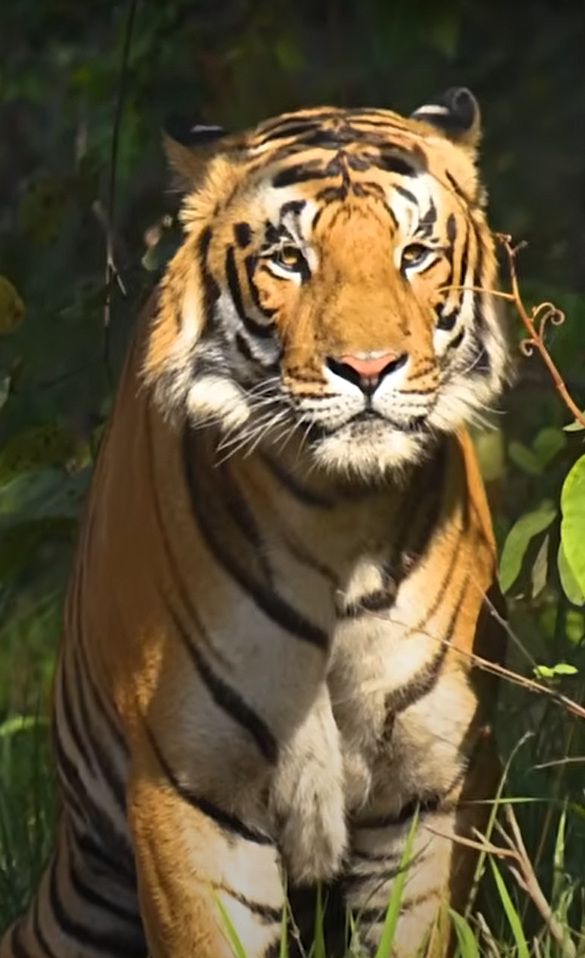
Sultan- largest amongst all the tigers in Pilibhit Tiger Reserve

== West Bengal ==
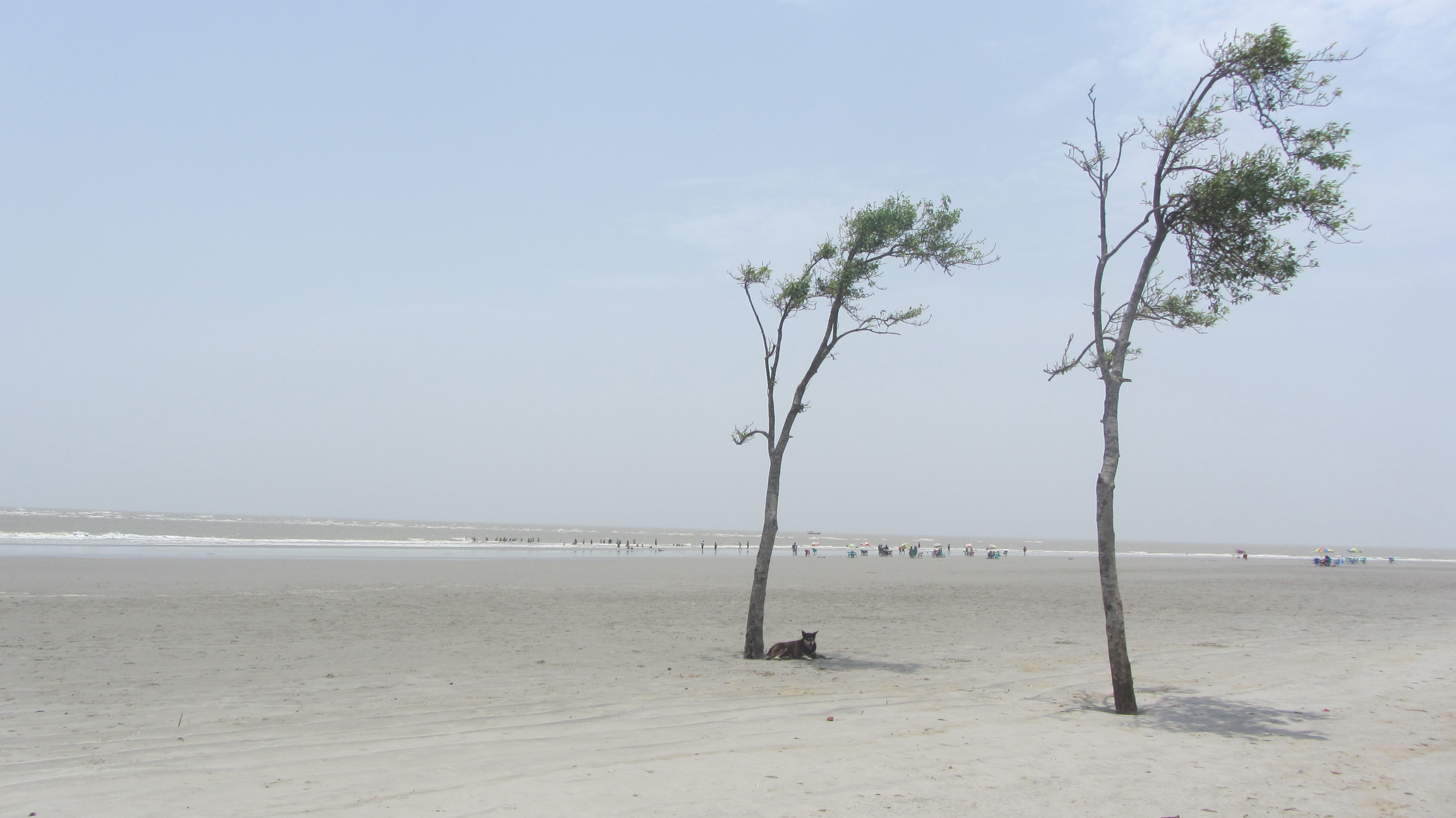
Bakkhali on the Bay of Bengal coast

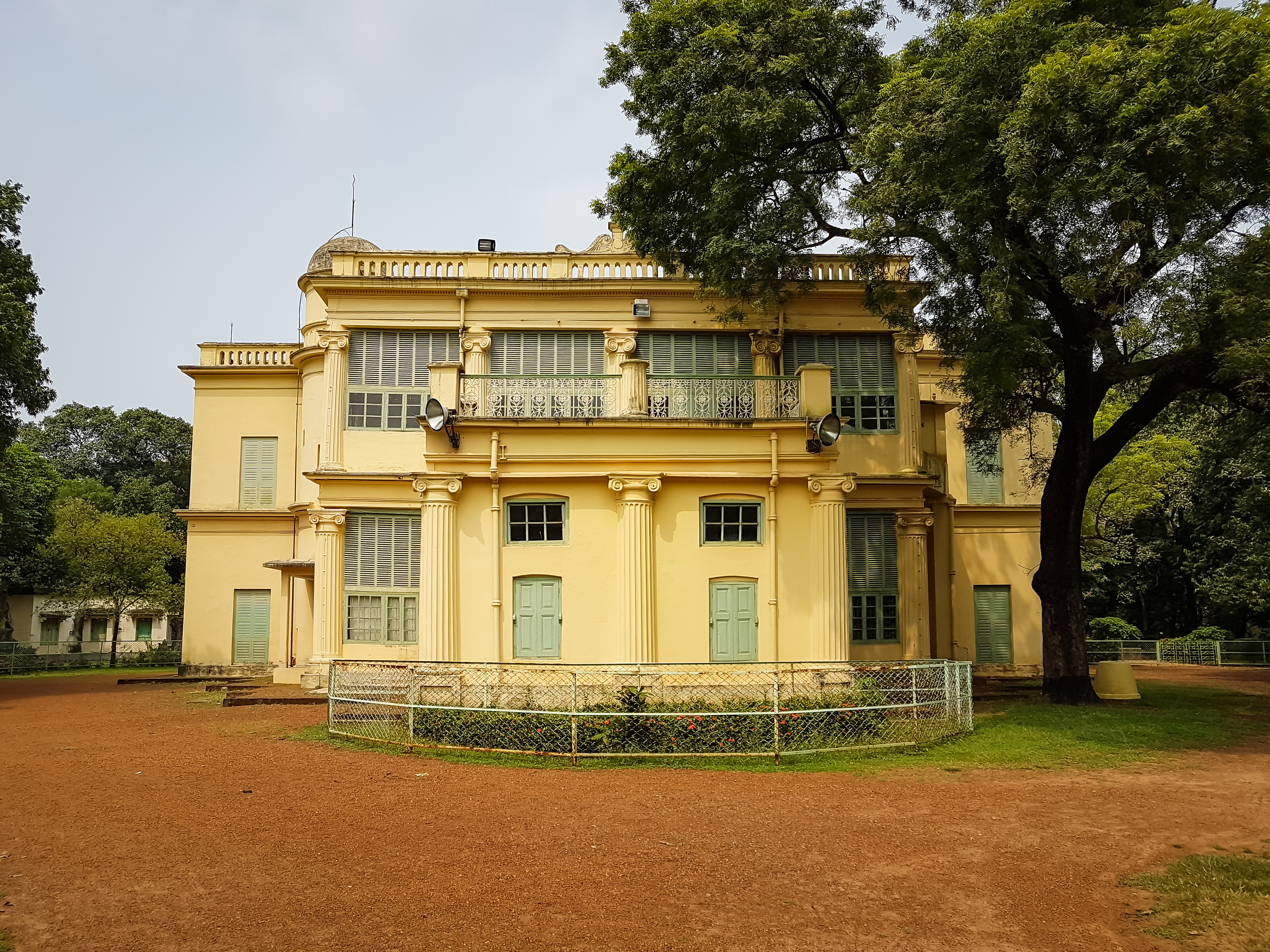
Santiniketan (UNESCO World Heritage Site)

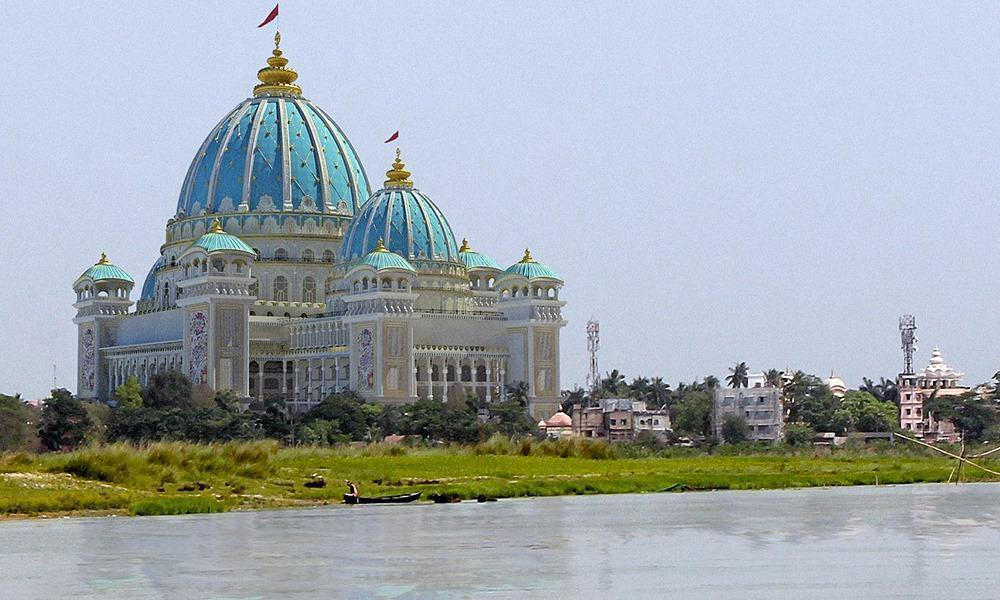
Mayapur temple complex at Nabadwip–Mayapur

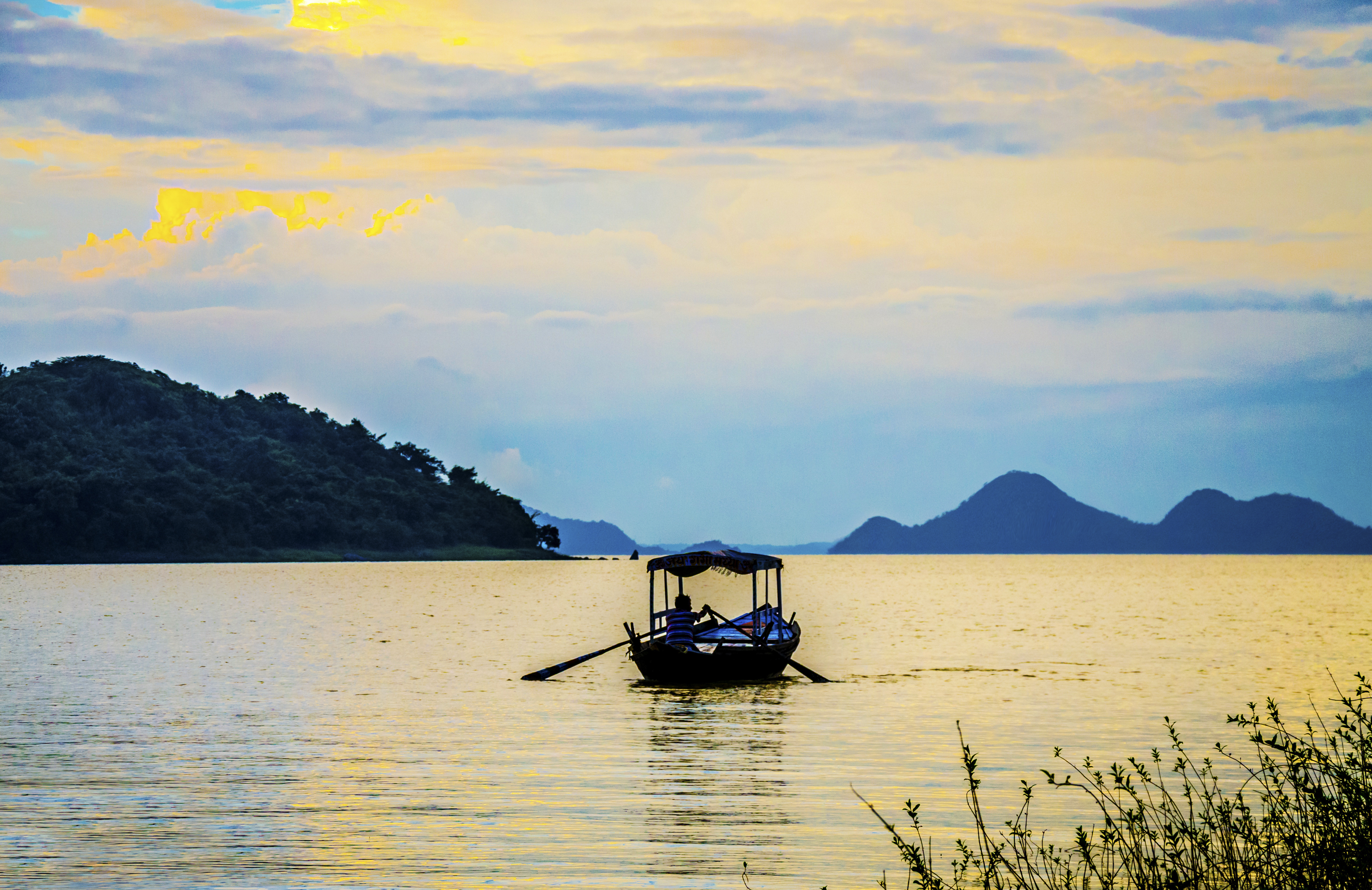
Maithon reservoir

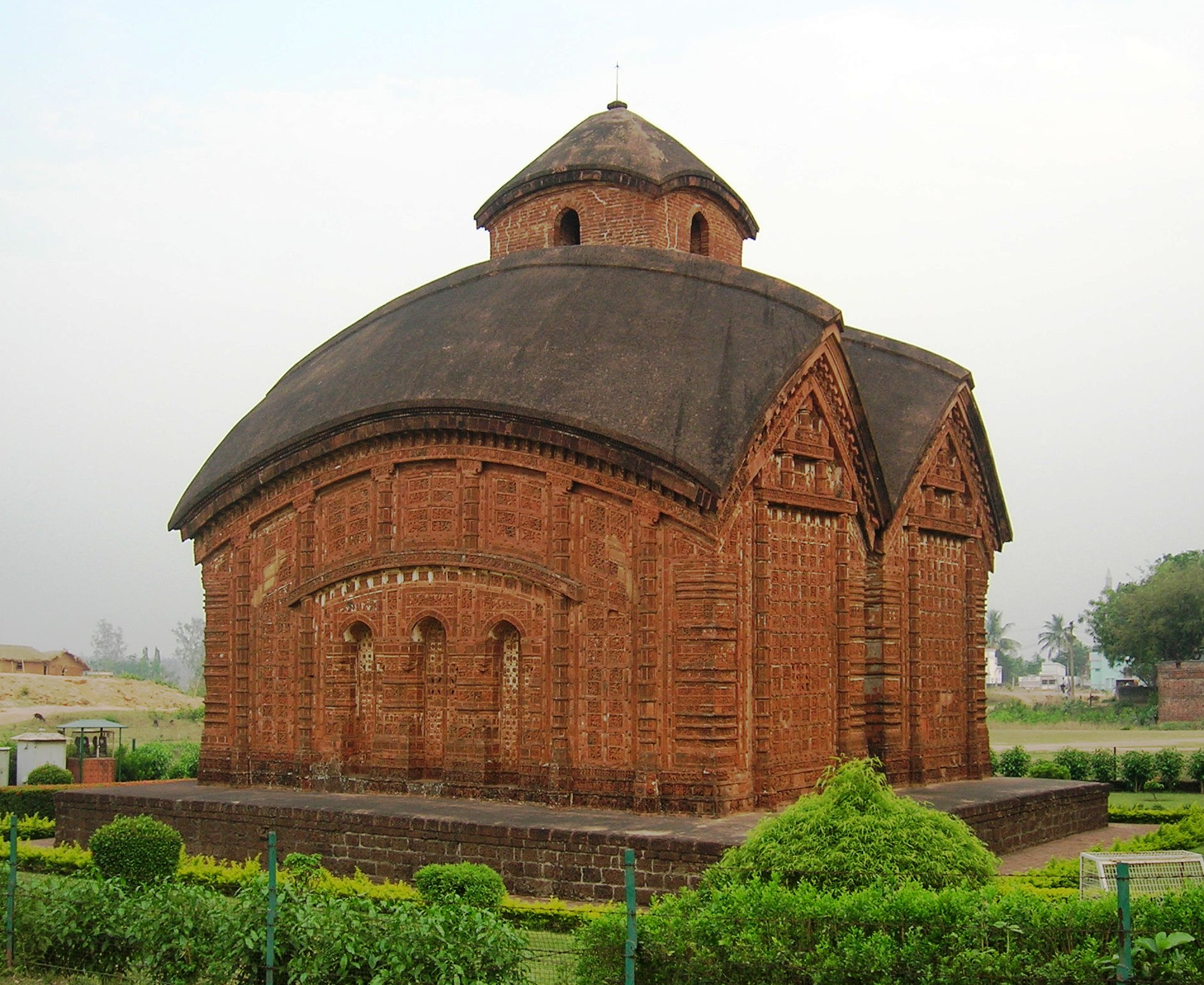
Jor Bangla Temple at Bishnupur

West Bengal features UNESCO-listed sites and diverse landscapes from the Himalayan foothills to the Sundarbans delta, alongside historic architecture in cities and temple towns. Santiniketan was inscribed on the UNESCO World Heritage List in 2023, while Sundarbans National Park is part of the mangrove delta recognized by UNESCO since 1987; the Darjeeling Himalayan Railway is included within the UNESCO "Mountain Railways of India".

Selected places: - Kolkata — Colonial-era architecture and museums alongside major places of worship and cultural institutions such as Victoria Memorial, Howrah Bridge, Dakshineswar Kali Temple, and Belur Math. - Santiniketan (Birbhum) — Historic ashram-town founded by Rabindranath Tagore; inscribed on the UNESCO World Heritage List in 2023. - Sundarbans National Park — Mangrove landscape and tiger habitat in the lower delta, recognized by UNESCO as a World Heritage Site. - Darjeeling and the Darjeeling Himalayan Railway — Hill station and narrow-gauge rail heritage operating between New Jalpaiguri and Darjeeling. - Bishnupur — Terracotta temples including Jor Bangla Temple and other Malla-era monuments. - Bakkhali — Beach destination on the Bay of Bengal coast noted by the state tourism authority.

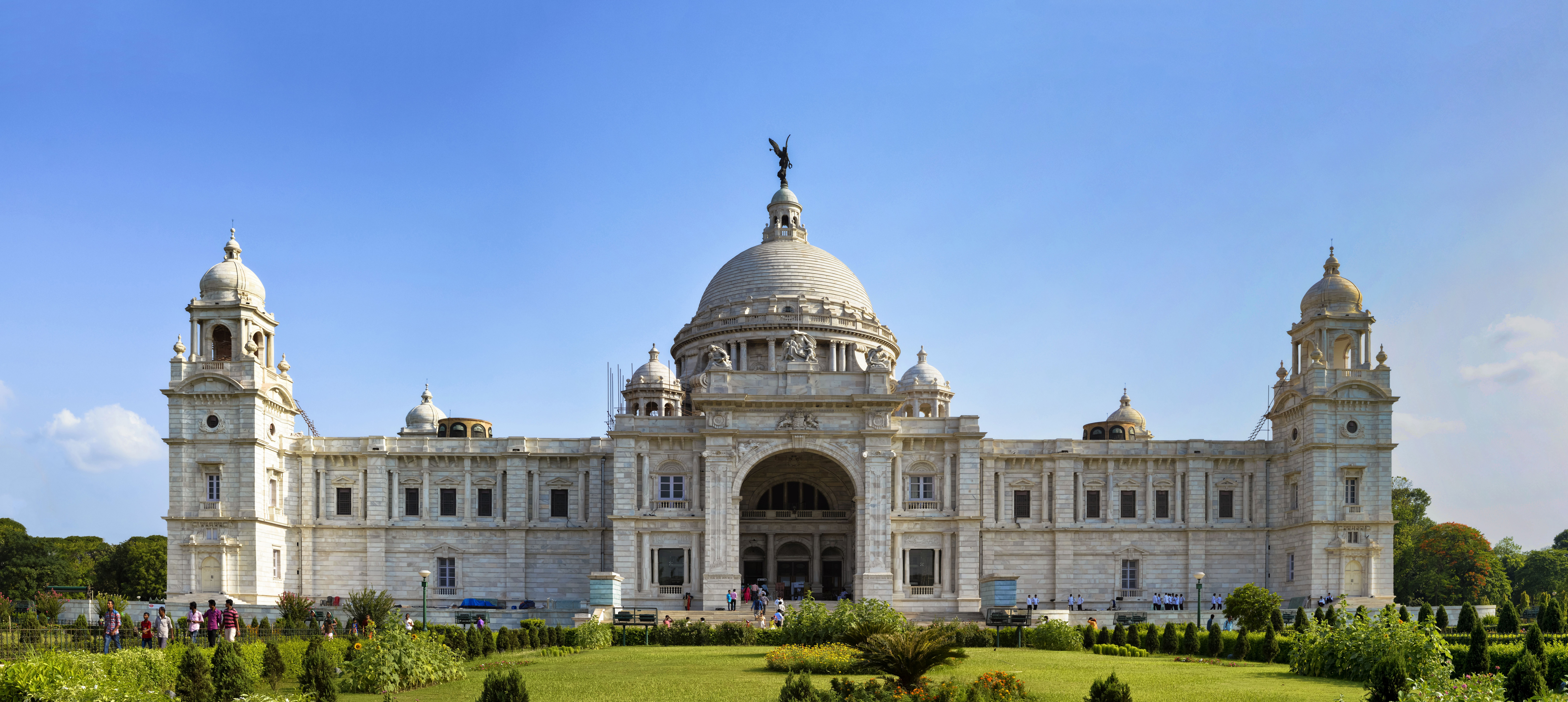
Victoria Memorial in Kolkata

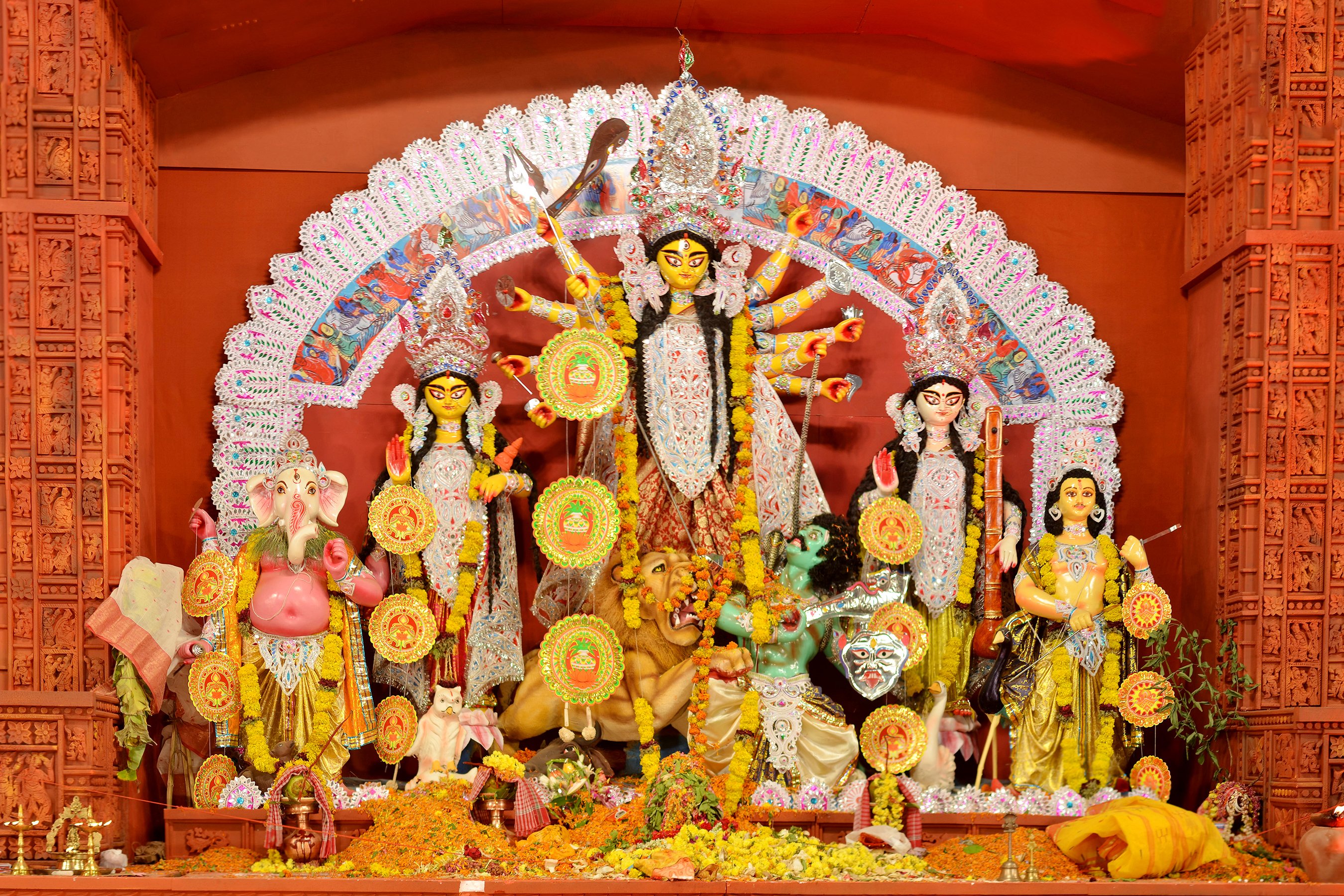
Durga Puja idol during the annual festival in Kolkata

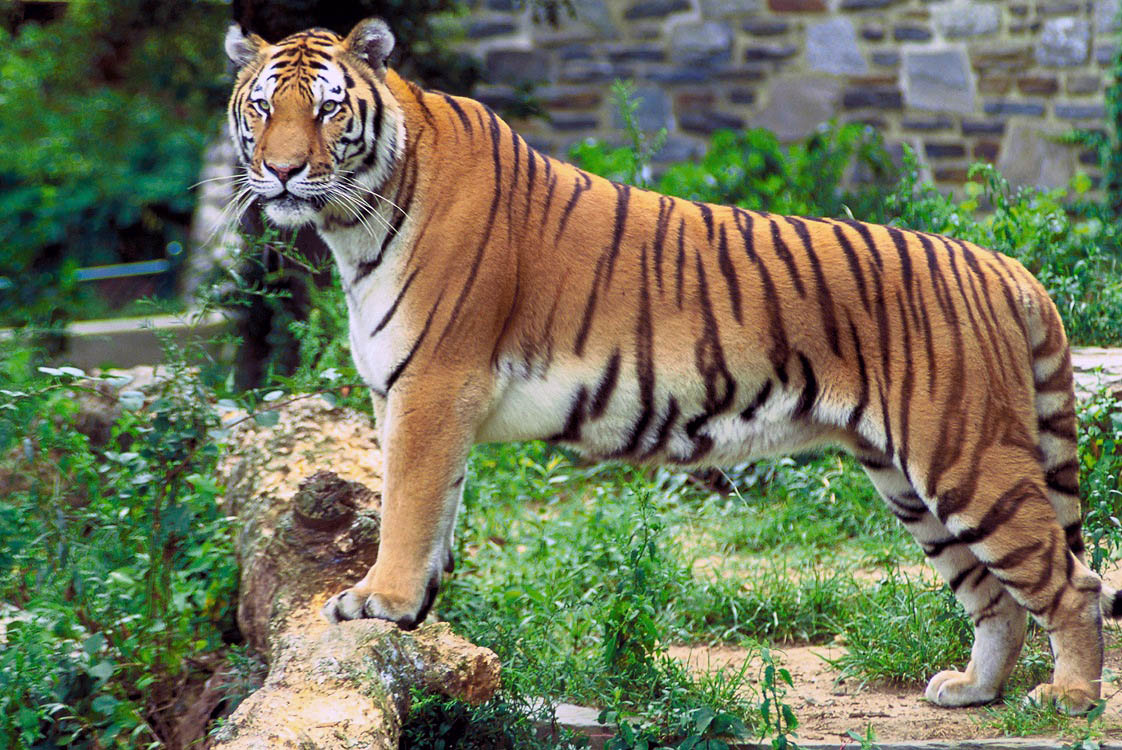
Royal Bengal tiger in Sundarbans National Park (UNESCO World Heritage Site)

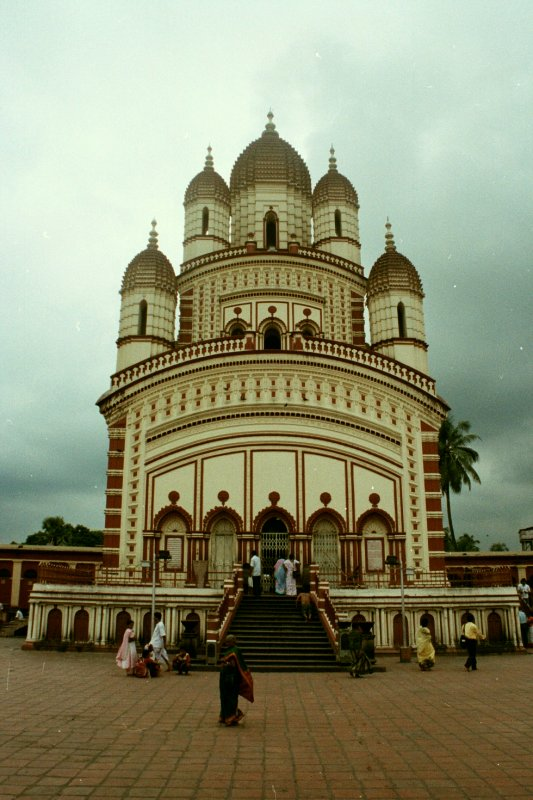
Dakshineswar Kali Temple in Kolkata

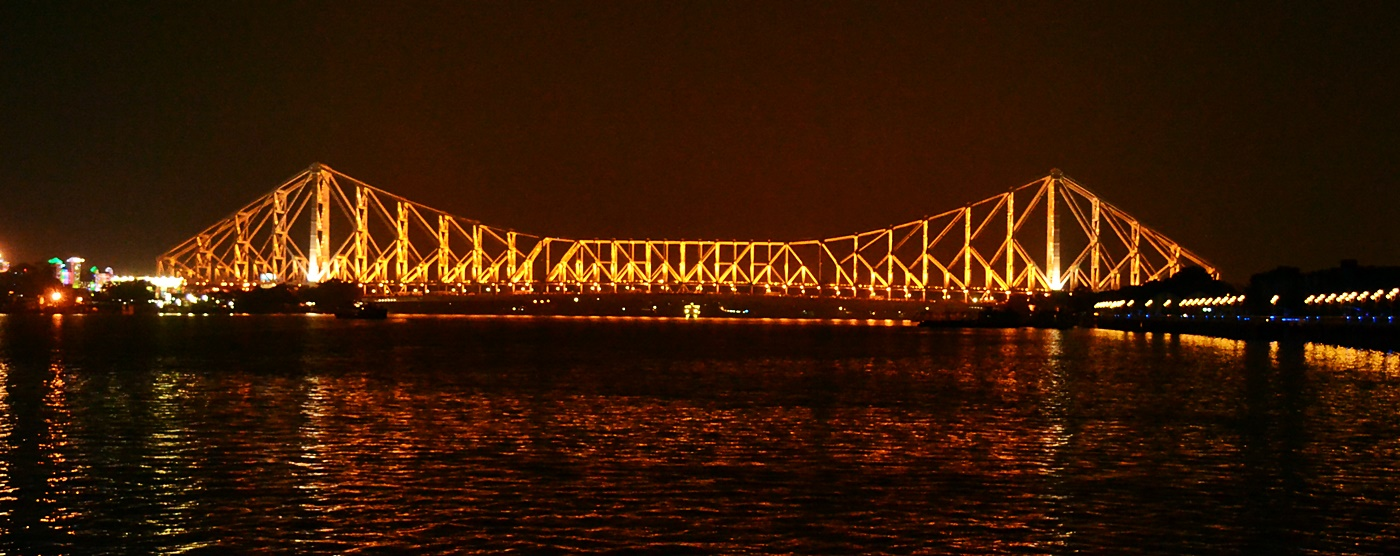
Howrah Bridge over the Hooghly River
