= Kumararama =

Hindu temple in India

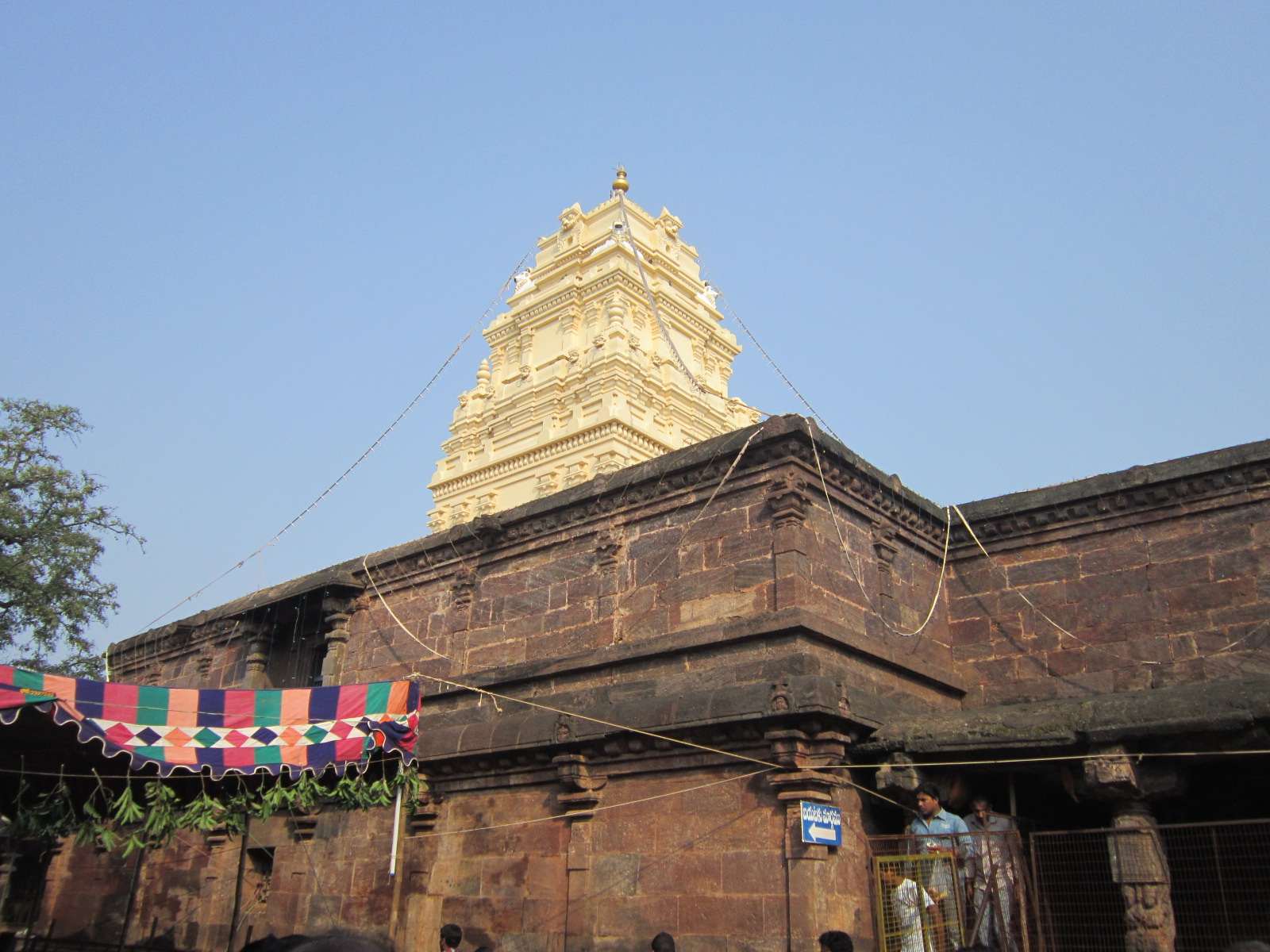
- Kumararama Bhimesvara Swami Temple

Religion
- Affiliation: Hinduism
- District: Kakinada
- Deity: Shiva, Bala Tripura sundari
- Festival: Maha Sivaratri

Location
- Location: Samarlakota
- State: Andhra Pradesh
- Country: India
- Interactive map of Kumararama
- Coordinates: 17.0423°N 82.1713°E

Architecture
- Type: Chalukya and Kakatiya
- Completed: 9th century
- Temple: One

Kumararama or Bhimarama (Chalukya Kumararama Bhimeswara Temple) is one of the five Pancharama Kshetras that are sacred to the Hindu god Shiva. The temple is located in Samalkota of Kakinada district in the Indian state of Andhra Pradesh. The other four temples are Amararama at Amaravati(Dist. Guntur), Draksharama at Draksharama (Dist. East Godavari), Ksheerarama at Palakollu and Somarama at Bhimavaram(both in Dist. West Godavari). It is one of the centrally protected monuments of national importance.

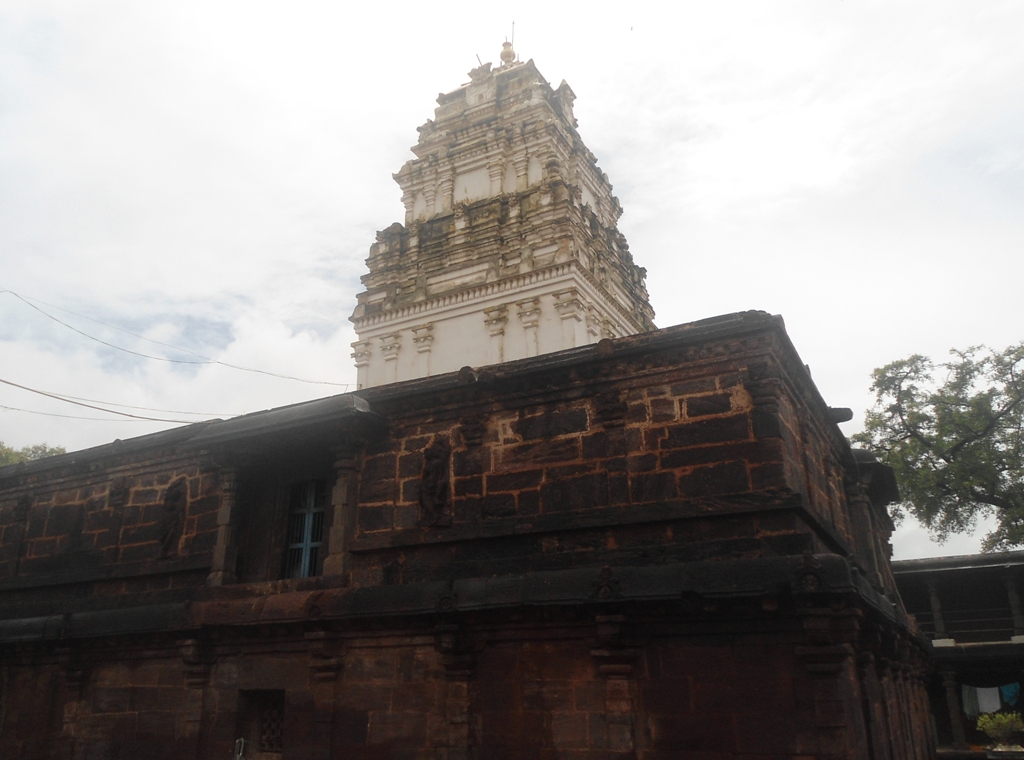
Kumara Bhimarama Temple at Samalkota

== Temple ==
The temple is 1 kilometer from Samarlakota City. The limestone Linga, installed in the shrine, is 16 feet tall that it rises from the pedestal on the ground floor and enters the second floor by piercing the roof, where the Rudrabhaga is worshipped. The temple has a mandapam that is supported by 100 pillars and is of great architectural importance. The temple has an Ekasila Nandi (A Bull carved from a single stone) guarding the Shiva Lingam at the entrance of the temple. The temple resembles the other Pancharama temple at Draksharama which is also called Bhimeswara Alayam. To the East side, there is a mantap called Koneti. Pushkarni (Koneru) lake can be seen here.The big Mandapam of the temple was built by Ganga Mahadevi, daughter-In-Law of Eastern Ganga Dynasty king Narasingha Deva I of Odisha.

The temple is historically prominent, as it was built by Chalukyas who reigned over this location. The construction of the temple was started in AD 892 and was completed during 922. It is similar to the temple in Draksharamam, but is also unique, such as the linga being white. The temple still stands strong, and it was made a National Heritage Site. It resembles a twin of Draksharam, with two staired Mandapa, and notable that it is in excellent condition, without any cracks.

The linga is a limestone, 14 feet (4.3 m) high. The temple was built in Dravidian style, by the King Chalukya Bhima. Hence, the god name is Bhimeswara (between 892-922CE). The Kakatiya rulers (in the period 1340-1466CE; Musunuri Nayaks) have added and renovated the temple pillars with very fine sharp finishes. The work of Chalukyas and Kakatiyas is very easily distinguished, by the well-decorated and polished pillars in the temple to the rest of the temple, both new and old. The construction of this temple is so solid that it has not changed much through all the years, when compared to the Draksharaam temple. Kala Bhairava is also of importance, and Balatripura sundari is the Goddess. Sasanas between 1147-1494 were scripted into pillars of the temple, which also have lists of gifts given, through the ages, for the temple. Recent excavations in the compound of the temple has yielded many figures dated back 1000 years are now present inside the temple. In Puranas it has been written that it is a Yogakshetram, which means, the person who has the "yogam" ("fated to have" or "opportunity given by god" or "boon") to visit, will visit the temple.

Here the Goddess is also known as Bala Tripura Sundari.

== Festivals ==
During November–December (Karthika and Margashira masam) months daily Abhisheka is carried out. There will be Utsavam (Kalyana Mahotsam) during February–March (Magha Bahula Ekadashi day) time. Till Maha Sivarathri grand celebrations in the temple can be seen. Temple timings are from morning 6.00am to 12.00 noon and after noon 4.00pm to 8.00pm. Additional places of interest around Samalkot include Draksharama, Annavaram, Thalupulamma Thalli and Rajahmundry.

== Tourism ==
The Sri Chalukya Kumararama Sri Bhimeswaraswamy vari temple is a temple in Samalkota. The presiding deity at this temple is Shiva, known as Kumara Bhimeswara. The most important festival that is celebrated in this temple is Maha Sivarathri.

The Andhra Pradesh State Road Transport Corporation (APSRTC), Kakinada Depot runs circular tours covering all the 5 pancharamas (Amaravathi, Bhimavaram, Palakollu, Draksharama, and Samalkota) in a span of 24 hours. The journey starts at 8:00 pm every Sunday and ends at 8:00 pm next day covering 700 km (430 mi) approximately. Currently charges are Rs.350/- and are inclusive of darshan charges at the respective places.

== Mandavya narayana swamy temple ==
Nearby this temple, there is one more temple, "Mandavya narayana swamy temple". This temple is situated on one bank of the canal. Once upon a time, a great saint named Madavya did tapas for Narayanaswamy at this place, and he got the dharshan of Lord Narayana swamy at this place. So this temple is named as Mandavya Narayana Swamy temple. It is said that Indra came to this place to have the saint Mandavya dharshan, with his Pushpaka Vimanam. This temple was built with very good architecture. In Samalkot, there is one more old temple which has more age than above-mentioned temples, i.e. "Trimukha lingam temple". As the lingam has three faces, this temple is named like that, and the three faces are believed as the Trimurtulu (Brahma, Vishnu, Shiva). This temple was totally buried, and only the upper portion is visible, of the lingam, which is of 14 ft (4.3 m) long.

Sri Ganapathi Sri Lakshmidevi Sri Veeravenkatasatyanarayana Swamy Temple at Ganapathinagaram, Peddapuram Road was originally built by Manyam Venkatapathi over 150 years ago and was renovated in March 2006 by The Manyam Family. The deities of all the Shaktipeethams and Jyothirlinghams are displayed in Prakaram.

== Gallery ==
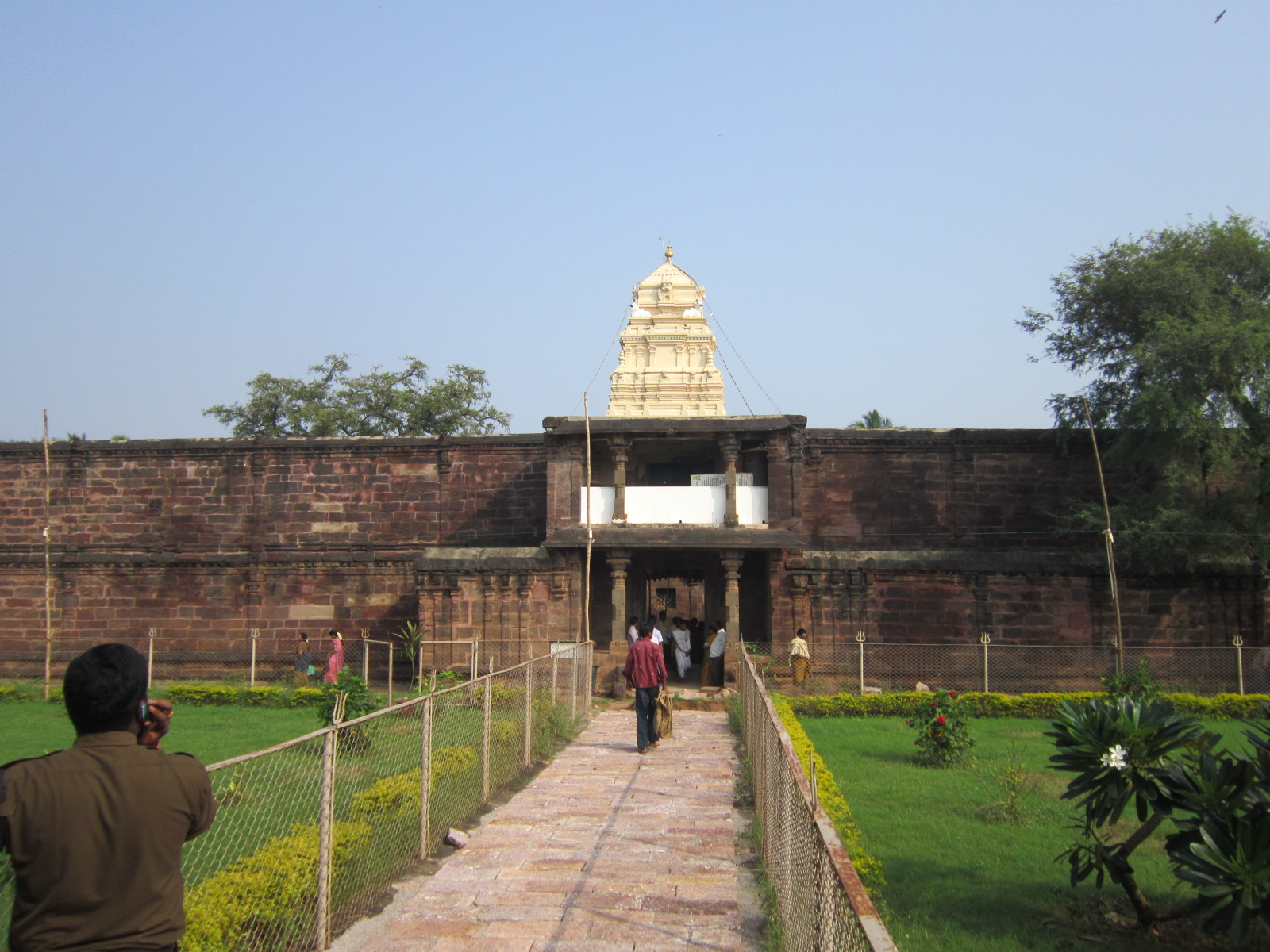
Temple view from south

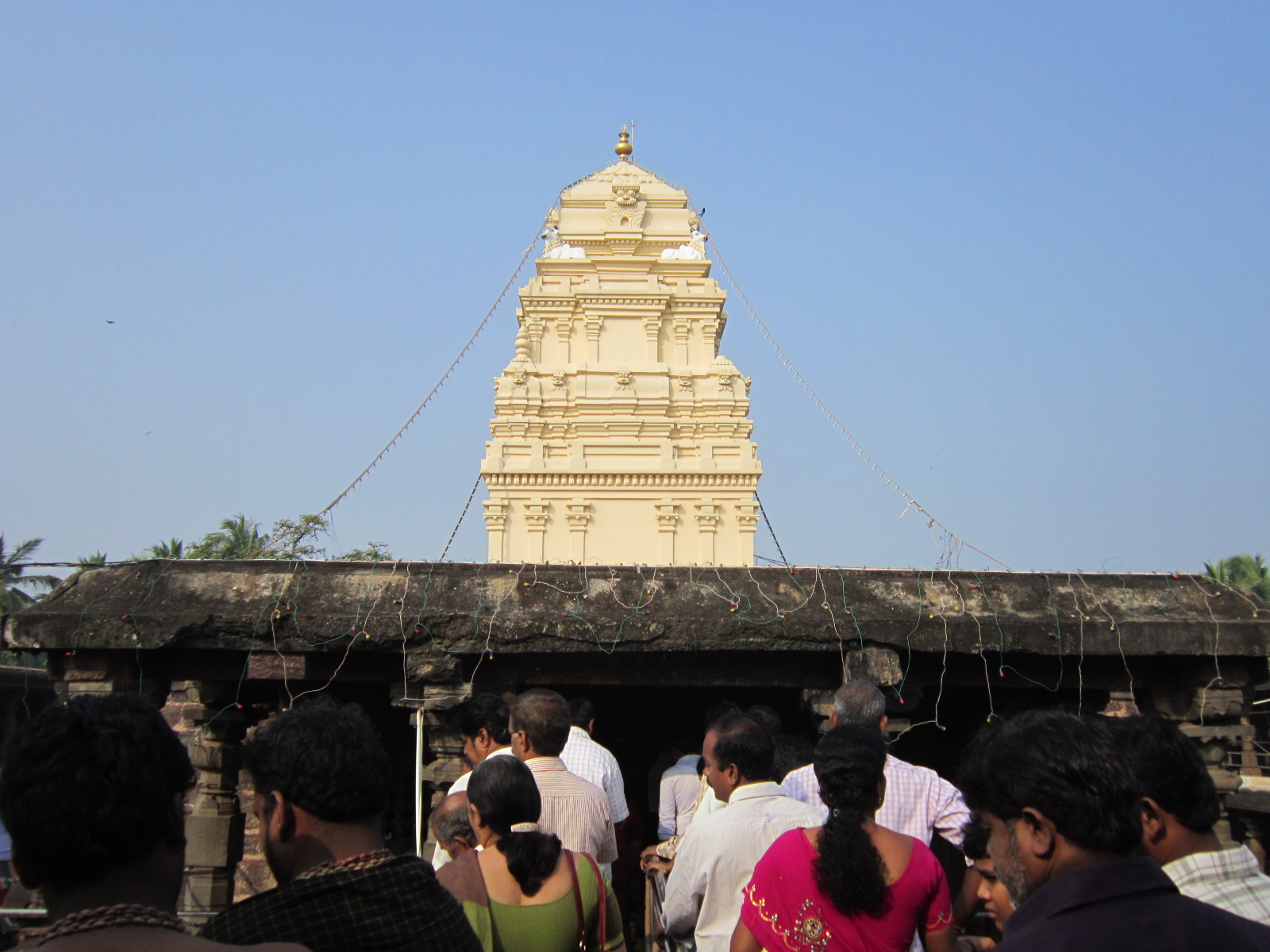
Gopuram from first floor(store)

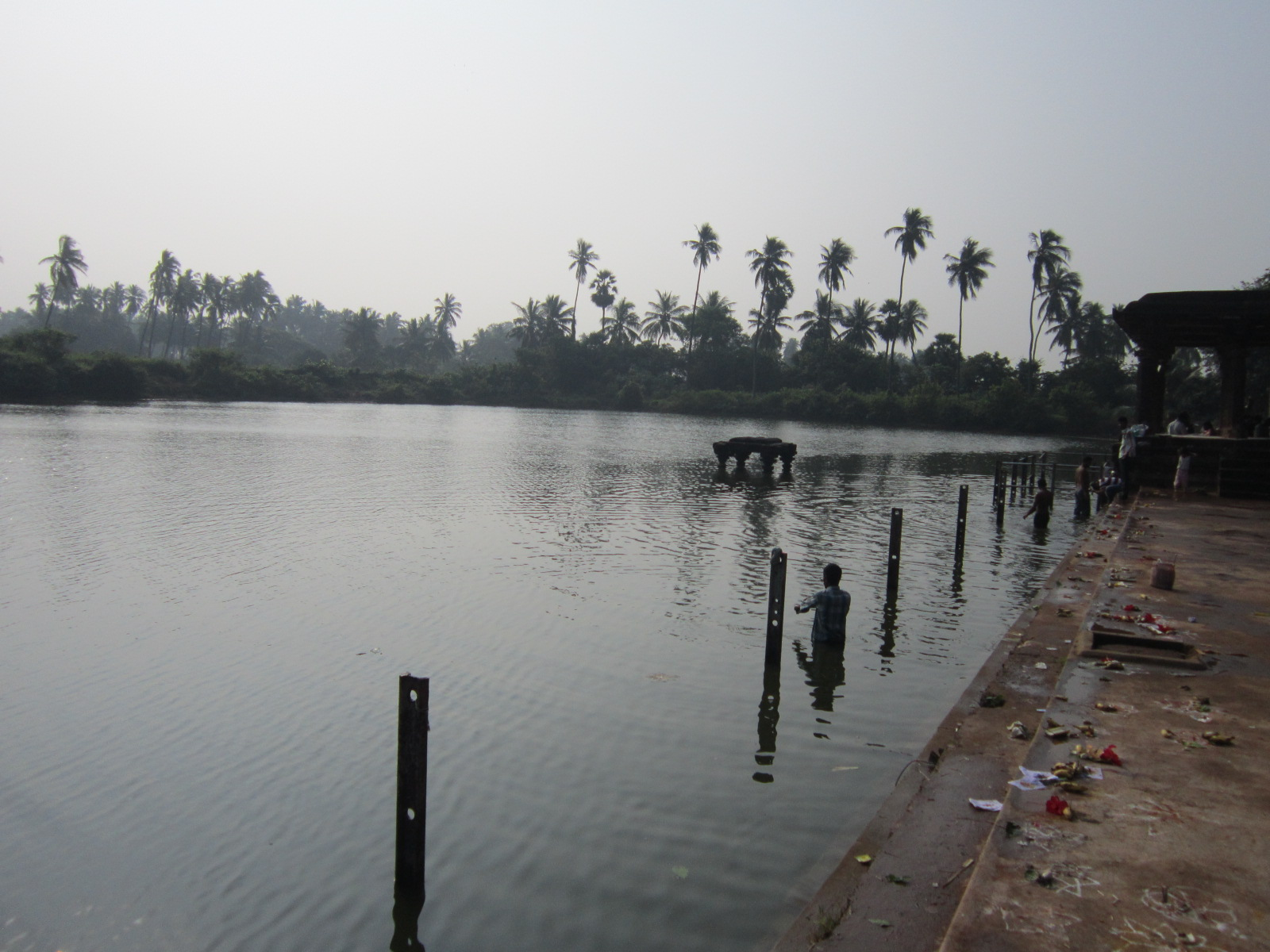
Pushakarani

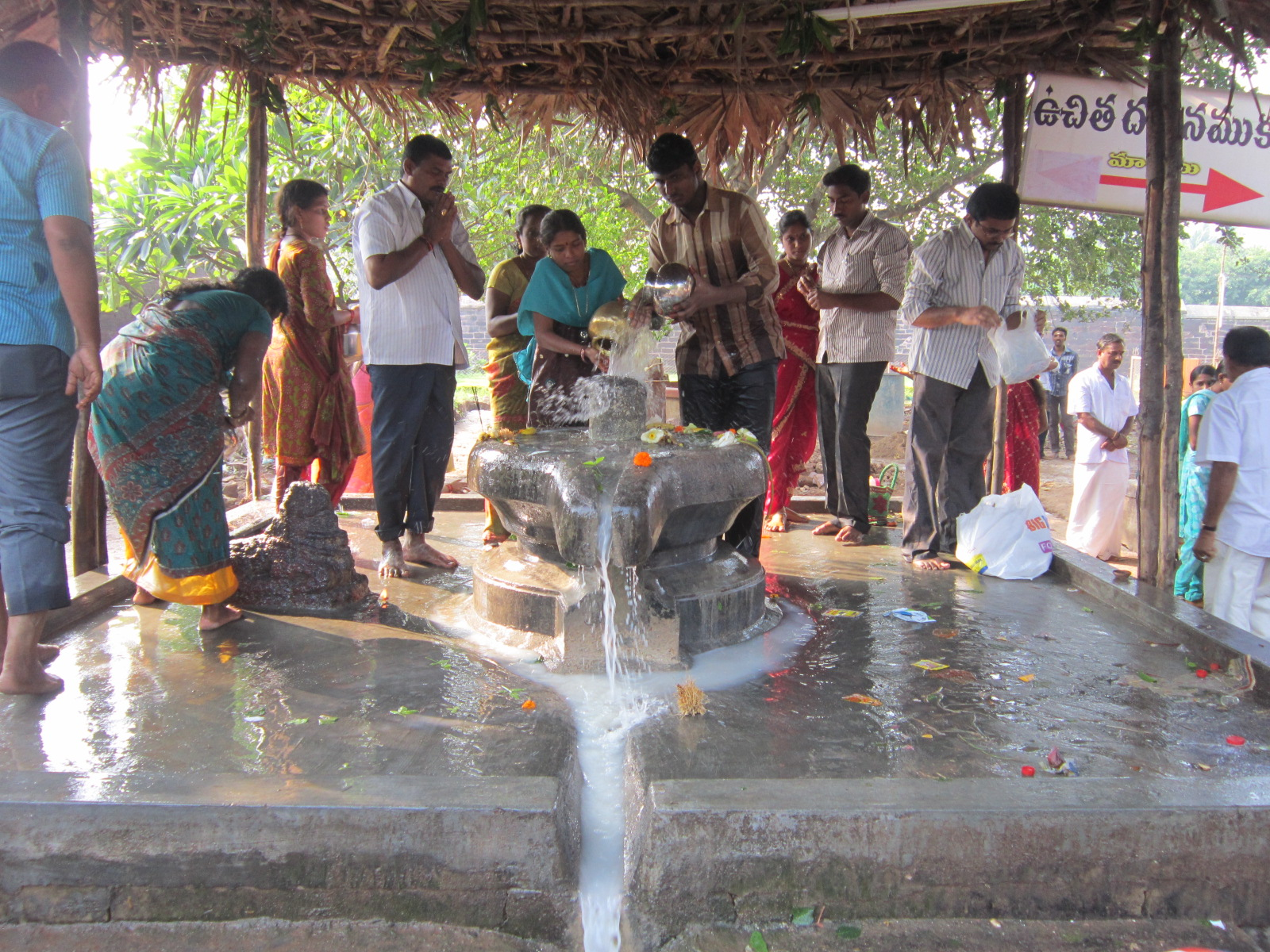
Abhisheka Shiva lingam, in the temple premises

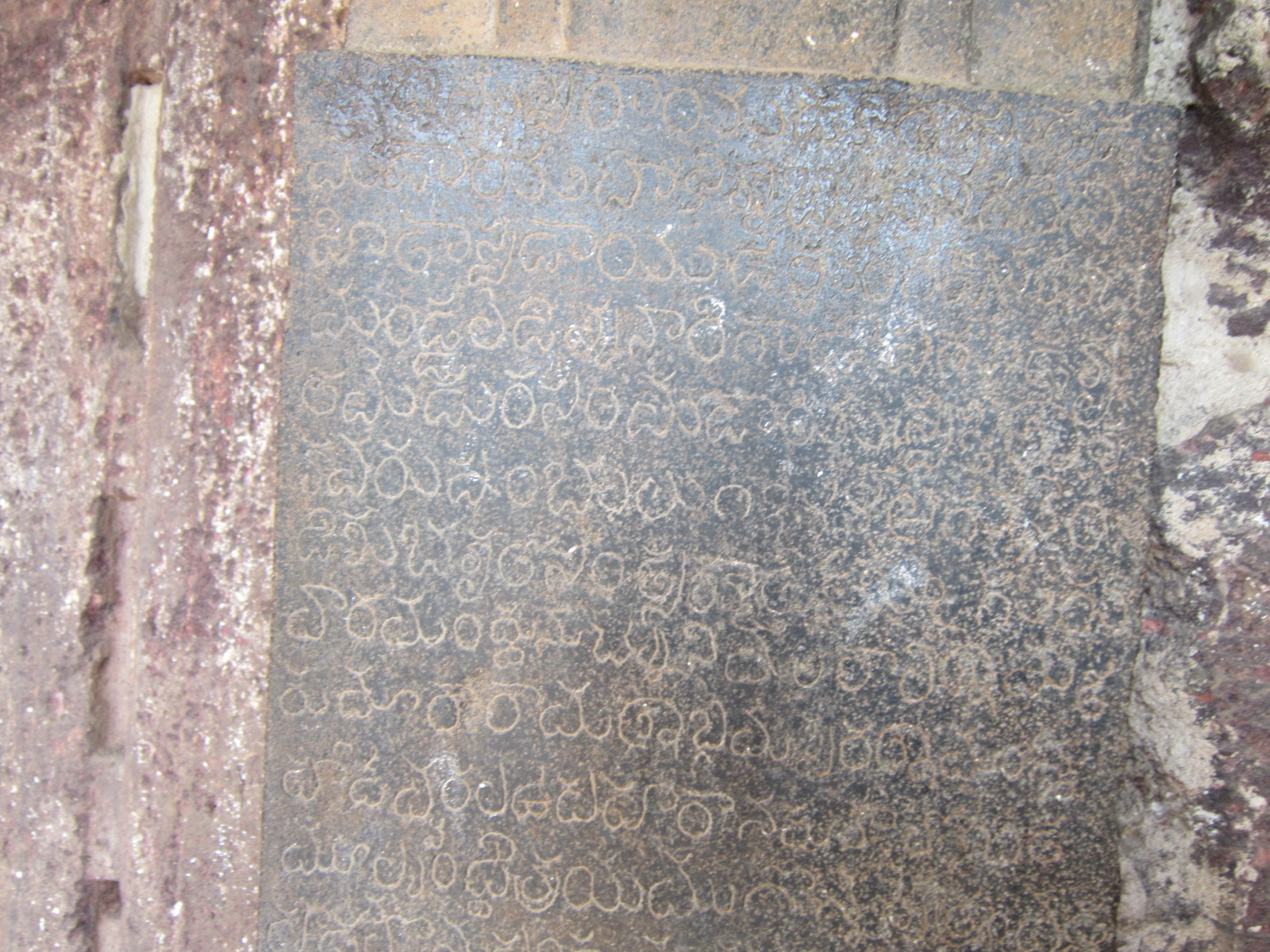
silasasanam(ancient carving on stones

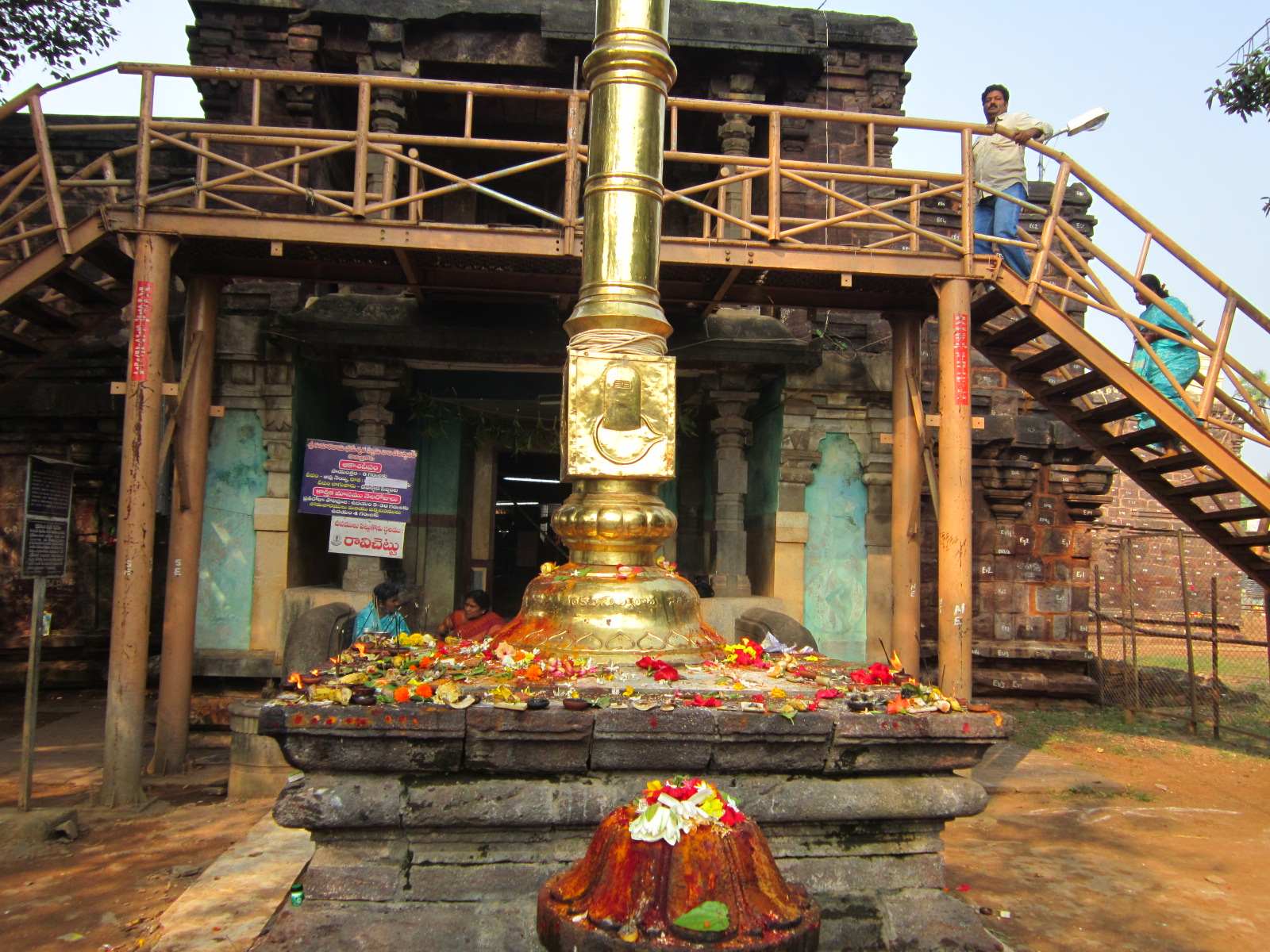
Dvaja stambam
