= Amararama =

Hindu temple in India

Amararamam
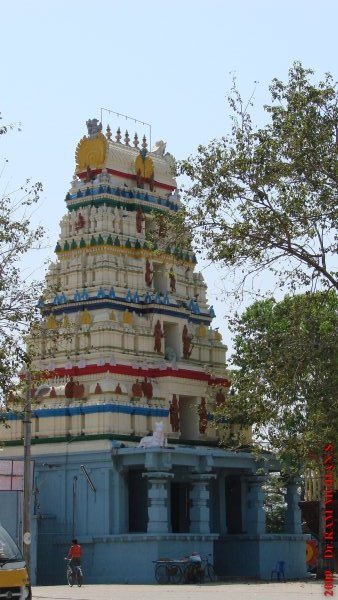
- Amareswara Swamy temple

- Location in Andhra Pradesh

Religion
- Affiliation: Hinduism
- District: Palnadu
- Deity: Shiva
- Festivals: Maha Sivaratri, Kartika Purnima

Location
- Location: Amaravathi
- State: Andhra Pradesh
- Country: India
- Coordinates: 16.580990°N 80.358946°E

Architecture
- Type: Dravidian architecture
- Established: 11th century

Specifications
- Temple: 1
- Inscriptions: Telugu and Sanskrit
- Elevation: 31.4 m (103 ft)

Amararamam is a Hindu temple dedicated to Lord Siva, located in Amaravathi of Palnadu district in the Indian state of Andhra Pradesh. It is one of the five sacred Pancharama Kshetras and is unique for being situated on the Krishna River, unlike the others in the Godavari region. The temple enshrines a 15-foot white marble Sivalinga, and daily rituals are performed by priests on a platform. The main deity, Lord Amareswara (also known as Amaralingeswara), is accompanied by his consort, Bala Chamundika.

The temple, based on epigraphical and historical evidence, is believed to have originated in the 11th century, with the earliest inscription dating back to 1129 CE. The temple has been patronized by various dynasties, including the Kota chiefs, and the Vijayanagara Empire, with notable contributions from Sri Krishnadevaraya. Major renovations were carried out in the late 18th century.

Built in the Dravidian architectural style, the temple features four gopuras and a central vimana. It is a significant spiritual and historical site, drawing pilgrims from across the region. Major festivals, such as Maha Sivaratri and Navaratri, are celebrated here. The temple is located on Krouncha Saila, a small hill near the Krishna River, and the surrounding village of Amaravathi is named after it. This village also inspired the name of Andhra Pradesh's planned capital, Amaravati, located 35 kilometers to the east.

== History ==
The Amareswara temple is believed to have been constructed in the 11th century, based on epigraphical evidence. However, its architectural style closely resembles the Bhimeswara temples of Samalkot and Draksharama, which date back to the 10th century. Among the 35 inscriptions found on the temple's walls, the earliest dates to 1129 CE. Legends associated with the Bhimeswara temples may have contributed to the temple's connections with them. Additionally, one of the earliest recorded inscriptions in the temple region is an Eastern Chalukya epigraph found at Dharanikota, near Amaravati.

The temple's foundation reflects early Buddhist influence, featuring elements like a white marble lotus medallion and a cylindrical mula virat in the sanctum. These features have led to theories that the site may have initially been a Buddhist place of worship. The discovery of a Chaturmukha Linga and a small mukhalinga sculpture, both dating to the Satavahana dynasty (1st–2nd centuries CE), underscores the antiquity of Saivism in the region. Additionally, a life-sized, intricately decorated Nandi statue from the Satavahana era, found near the temple, reflects the craftsmanship of that period and suggests the early prominence of Saivism in Amaravathi.

By the 12th century, the coexistence of Hindu and Buddhist structures was evident in Amaravathi. Inscriptions and accounts from this period reference both the Buddhist Mahachaitya and the Amareswara Temple. A 1184 CE inscription by Kota chief Keta II describes the Buddhist stupa as "chaityam-atyunnatam yatra nānā chitra suchitritam" (magnificent and adorned). The same inscription also reverently mentions Lord Siva as Amareswara, indicating a harmonious blend of religious traditions. Furthermore, inscriptions on the temple pillars record lamp donations to Lord Buddha by Keta II and his courtesans, suggesting the presence of a Buddhist temple in the vicinity, which has since disappeared.

The temple continued to receive patronage in subsequent centuries. During the 14th-century Reddi dynasty and the 16th-century Vijayanagara Empire, significant contributions were made to the temple. Notably, Sri Krishnadevaraya (r. 1509–1529) added a mandapam (pavilion), further solidifying the temple's cultural and religious importance.

In the late 18th century, the temple underwent extensive expansion under the patronage of Vasireddy Venkatadri Nayudu, the zamindar of Chintapalli. A devout follower of Lord Siva, Venkatadri Nayudu later built and relocated to Amaravathi and provided financial support for the temple's upkeep. He allocated land to priests, ensuring the continuity of worship and maintenance at the site.

== Deity ==
The primary deity in the Amareswaraswamy Temple is a large Sivalinga, notable for its height, which requires priests to stand on a platform to perform daily rituals and the Abhisheka, a ceremonial anointment. According to temple lore, the Sivalinga once began to grow continuously, prompting devotees to drive a nail into its top to halt its expansion, resulting in a red mark where it is said blood emerged. The main idol, or Mula Virat, is a vertically aligned cylinder crafted from white marble.

== Legend ==
Legend attributes the origins of the temple to events involving the demon king Tarakasura, who, after receiving a boon from Lord Siva, defeated the gods. To restore order, Lord Shiva vowed to eliminate the demon, and the gods came to reside at the site, thus giving the name Amaravati. Here, Shiva is worshipped as Amareswara, accompanied by his consort Bala Chamundika, one of the 18 revered goddesses.

== Architecture ==
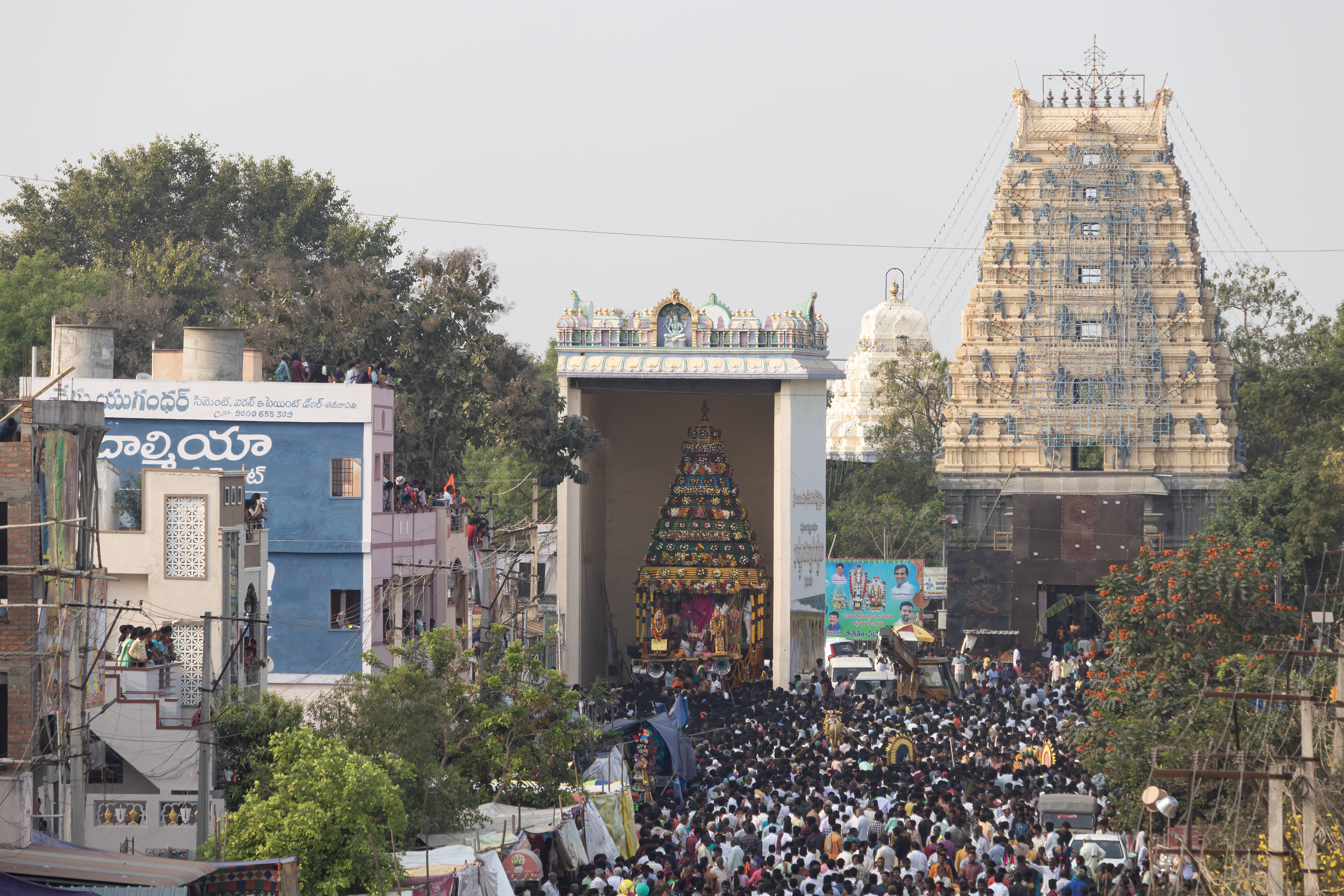
Amareswara Swamy temple during Rathayatra

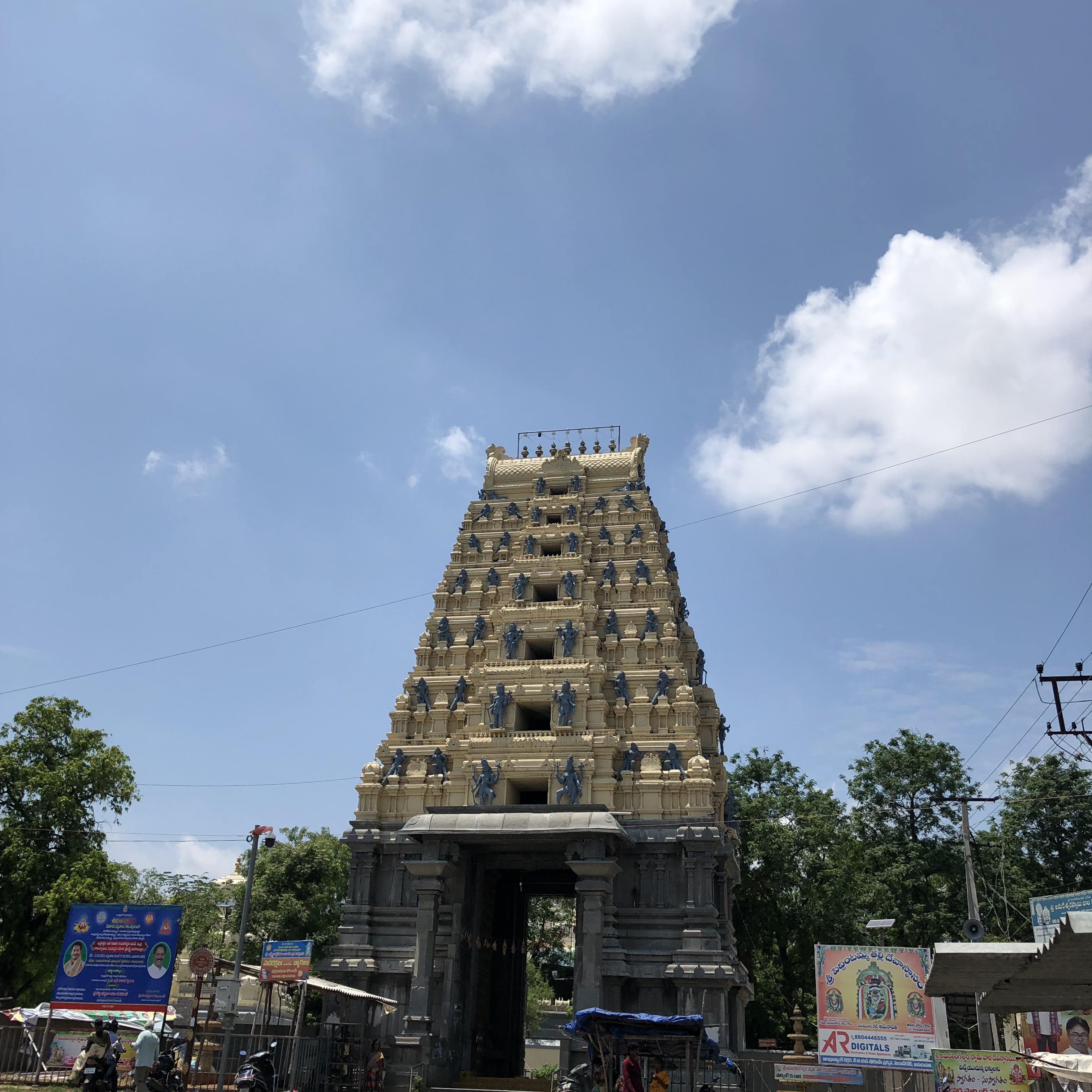
Amareswara Swamy temple

The Amararamam temple complex is surrounded by four towering gopuras in the Dravidian style, with a central vimana reflecting the same architectural design, enhancing its impressive structure. Located on Krouncha Saila, a small hill near the Krishna River, the temple combines Buddhist and Dravidian architectural influences.

Access to the sanctum sanctorum, which is elevated, is via a flight of steps, leading to the main deity, a 15-foot white marble lingam called Amareswara, also known as Amaralingeswara. This lingam is the largest among the Pancharama lingams, with a circumference of three feet, and is worshipped through prayers and abhisheka rituals performed from a platform within the sanctum. The temple also houses the goddess Bala Chamundeswari Devi, considered the consort of Lord Amareswara.

== Festivals ==
The temple hosts several major Hindu festivals, including Maha Sivaratri, which falls on Magha Bahula Dasami, and Navaratri, along with various Kalyana Utsavas. Its sacred location along the Krishna River elevates the temple's religious significance, making it an important pilgrimage site.

== Transport ==
The temple is located approximately 40 km from Guntur. The Andhra Pradesh State Road Transport Corporation (APSRTC) operates regular bus services from Guntur, Vijayawada, and Mangalagiri to Amaravathi.

== Renovation ==
In 2017, the temple's Gopuram was renovated to address structural cracks that had developed over time due to exposure to heavy equipment. This renovation, costing approximately ₹1.56 crore, revealed ancient artifacts dating back 1,800 years in the foundation pits.
