= Mandavya Narayana Swamy Temple =

Hindu temple in India

Sri Mandavya Narayana Swamy Temple
- శ్రీ మాండవ్య నారాయణస్వామి ఆలయం
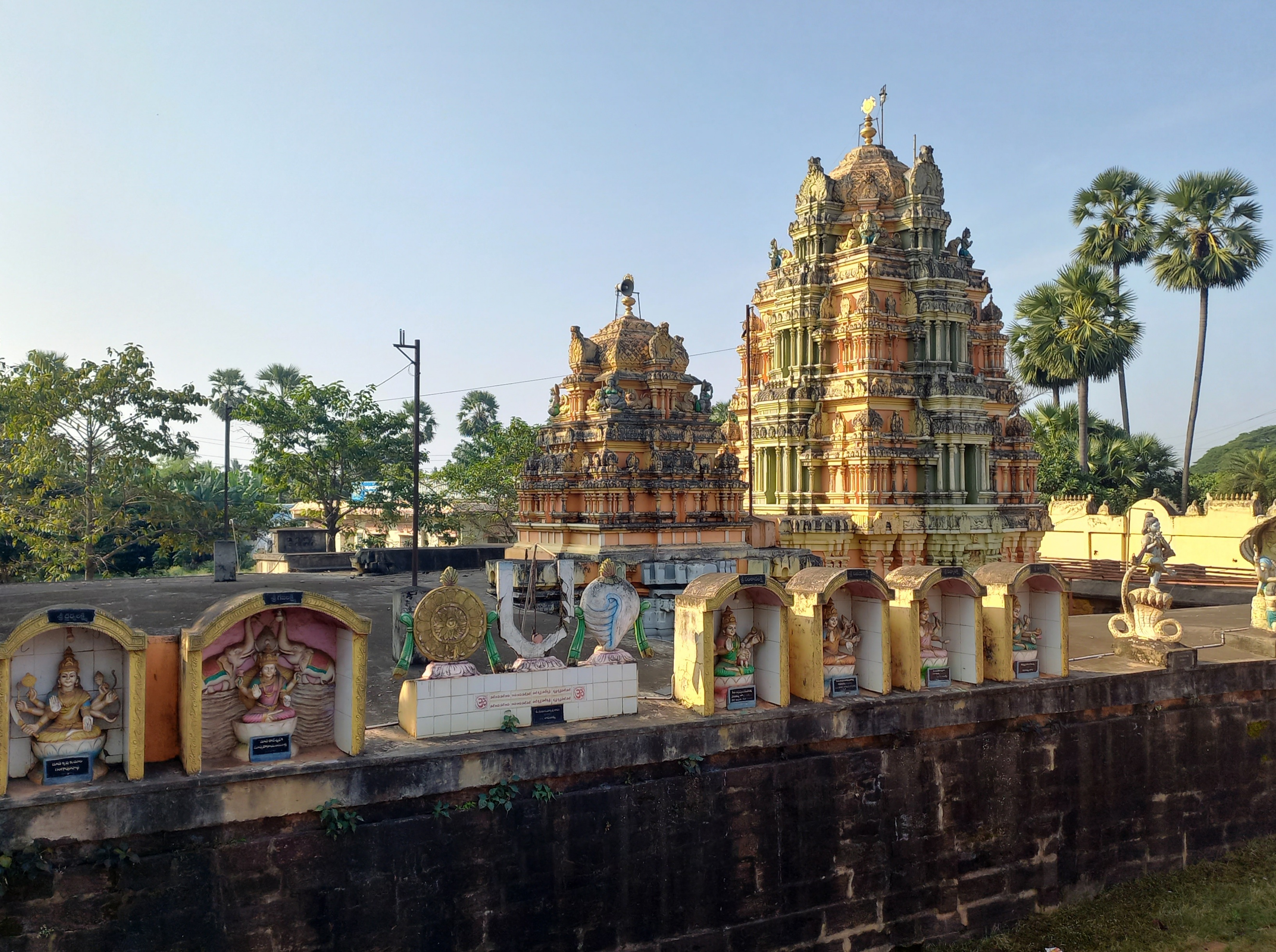
- Sri Mandavya Narayana Swamy Temple

- Location in Andhra Pradesh

Religion
- Affiliation: Hinduism
- District: Kakinada district
- Deity: Vishnu (Narayana)
- Festivals: Chaitra Sudha Ekadasi, Dhanurmasa, Sravana, Karthika

Location
- Location: Samarlakota
- State: Andhra Pradesh
- Country: India
- Coordinates: 17.0531°N 82.1695°E

Architecture
- Inscriptions: Telugu, Prakrit

Sri Mandavya Narayana Swamy Temple is a historic Hindu temple dedicated to Vishnu located in Samarlakota of Kakinada district, Andhra Pradesh, India. It is situated near the Pancharama Kshetra of Kumararama in the Chalukya Bhimavaram suburb of Samarlakota. Known for its spiritual and historical significance, the temple attracts numerous devotees, particularly during festivals and rituals.

The exact dating of the temple is a subject of scholarly debate, with some attributing its sculptures to the early Eastern Chalukyan period (7th century), while others place its construction in the 11th or early 12th century.

== History ==
Together with the nearby Kumararama Chalukya Bhimeswara Temple, the Mandavya Narayana Swamy Temple features several ancient inscriptions and reflects the cultural and architectural heritage of Chalukya Bhimavaram during the medieval period. However, the exact dating of the temple remains a subject of scholarly debate.

C. Sivaramamurti, in Early Eastern Chalukya Sculpture (1957), suggested that the name "Mandavya" might be a corruption of "Manavya," a gotra associated with the Eastern Chalukyas. He noted that the Vishnu temple once adorned with these carvings no longer exists. However, he attributed the sculptures to the early Eastern Chalukya period, likely during the reign of Kubja Vishnuvardhana's early successors. Some of the works reflect a blend of stylistic influences from the Rashtrakutas and Western Chalukyas.

While some scholars, such as B. Rajendra Prasad of Acharya Nagarjuna University, attribute the temple to the 11th century, an inscription dated 1115 CE provides a more precise timeline. This inscription credits a merchant named Mandavya with constructing the temple and donating 20 buffaloes to maintain a perpetual lamp. In recognition of this contribution, the temple was named after Mandavya.

Further inscriptions highlight the temple's importance over the centuries. A 1177 CE inscription records a land donation by Mallapa Deva for the temple's upkeep, while another inscription from 1272 CE mentions the construction of a pillar in the Thiruchuttu Maliga by Malli Reddy. Additionally, a copper-plate grant from Katama Vema Reddi of the Reddi dynasty, dated 1393 CE, adds to the temple's historical record.

== Legend ==
Sri Mandavya Narayana Swamy Temple is situated on the banks of the sacred Tulyabhaga River, one of the tributaries of the Godavari. According to legend, the temple was established by the sage Mandavya during the Treta Yuga as part of his penance in the Dandakaranya region. The deity, Lord Narayana, is said to derive his name from this sage.

== Architecture ==
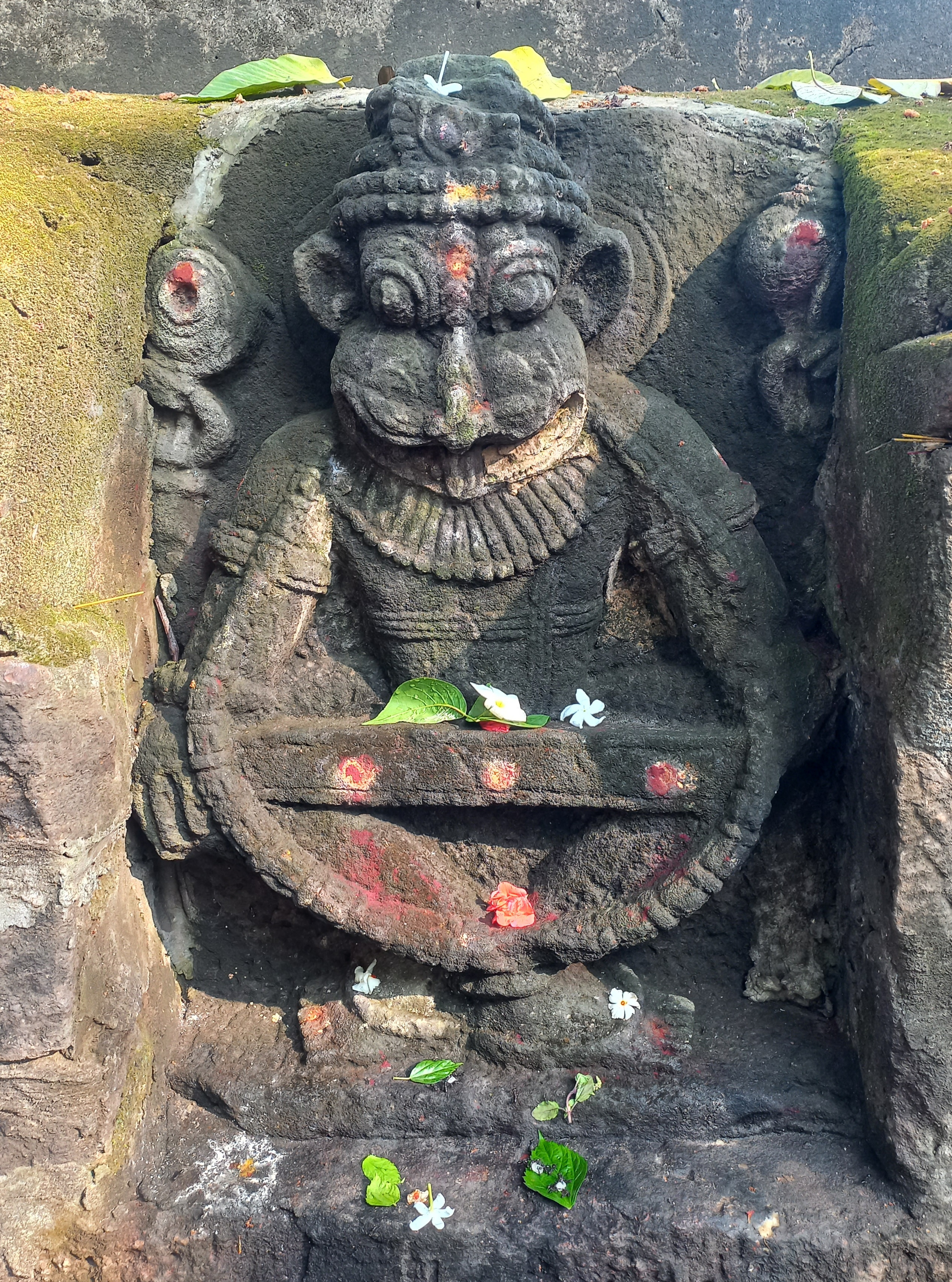
Relief of Yoga Narasimha at the temple

As per C. Sivaramamurti, the Mandavya Narayana temple showcases intricate carvings and sculptures that reflect the craftsmanship of ancient Eastern Chalukya artisans. Although the original structure has been replaced by a modern temple, fragments of early medieval Chalukyan art are preserved in the outer walls and garden. Sivaramamurti noted stylistic influences from the Rashtrakutas and Western Chalukyas in the sculptures, particularly in the intricate jewelry and figure compositions.

The temple features depictions of Hayagriva, Sesha Sai, Ananta Padmanabha, and Yoga Narasimha, highlighting its artistic and spiritual significance. The central sanctum houses the main deity, Lord Narayana, while an adjoining shrine is dedicated to Goddess Mahalakshmi, referred to locally as Veeralakshmi due to her independent consecration. The temple's walls and pillars are adorned with carvings of Garuda, Mahasiva, and various mythological figures, along with scenes from the Ramayana, Mahabharata, and Bhagavata. Notable sculptures include Ravana in a warrior pose, Rama and Lakshmana resting under a tree with Anjaneya, and Krishna mesmerizing cattle and cowherds with his flute.

The temple's architectural design incorporates astronomical alignments. At specific times of the year, sunlight falls directly on the deity's feet, demonstrating the technical expertise of ancient builders. This feature reflects the integration of celestial phenomena into temple construction.

== Religious significance ==
The temple is renowned for its sanctity and is regarded as a spiritual equivalent to Badrinath in northern India. Devotees believe that offerings made here bring prosperity and fulfillment of desires. A local legend mentions a mystical stone, Parusavedini, placed at the feet of the deity by Sage Mandavya, which was said to turn objects into gold. This legend adds to the temple’s mystique.

== Festivals ==
The temple celebrates several major Hindu festivals. Notable among them is Chaitra Sudha Ekadasi, a five-day grand festival that culminates in the celestial wedding of the deity. The temple also observes Dhanurmasa, Sravana, and Karthika, with elaborate rituals and special poojas held throughout these months. Daily and festival rituals at the temple follow the Vaikhanasa tradition, with priests from the same lineage performing worship for generations, preserving the temple’s spiritual and cultural heritage.

== Accessibility ==
The temple is part of the Andhra Pradesh State Road Transport Corporation (APSRTC)'s one-day pilgrimage covering the five Pancharama Kshetras. Regular buses and other transport facilities make it accessible to devotees from nearby regions.

On October 30, 2021, a theft at the temple resulted in the loss of ₹12,000, along with CCTV cameras and hard drives.

== See also ==
- List of Hindu temples in Andhra Pradesh
- Vaishnavism
