= Sivadevuni Chikkala =

Sri Sivadevuni Chikkala Temple
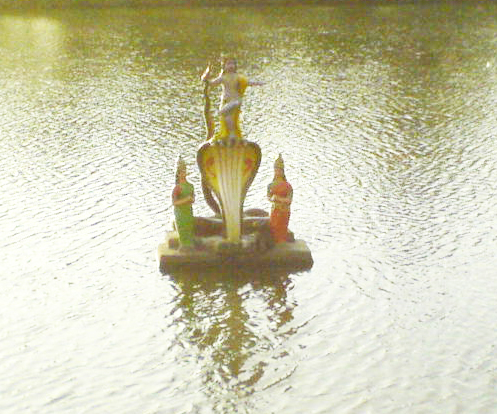
- Front View

- Location in Andhra Pradesh

Religion
- Affiliation: Hinduism
- District: West Godavari
- Deity: Sivadeva Swami (Siva) Parvati

Location
- Location: Andhra Pradesh, India
- State: Andhra Pradesh
- Country: India
- Interactive map of Sri Sivadevuni Chikkala Temple
- Coordinates: 16.5306°N 81.6499°E

Sivadevuni Chikkala is a village in Andhra Pradesh 8 km from Palakollu. There is a Hindu temple, Sri Sivadevuni Chikkala, where the main deity is Lord Shiva.

There is another Sivadevuni Chikkala village near Kakinada port.
