= Ksheerarama =

Hindu temple in India

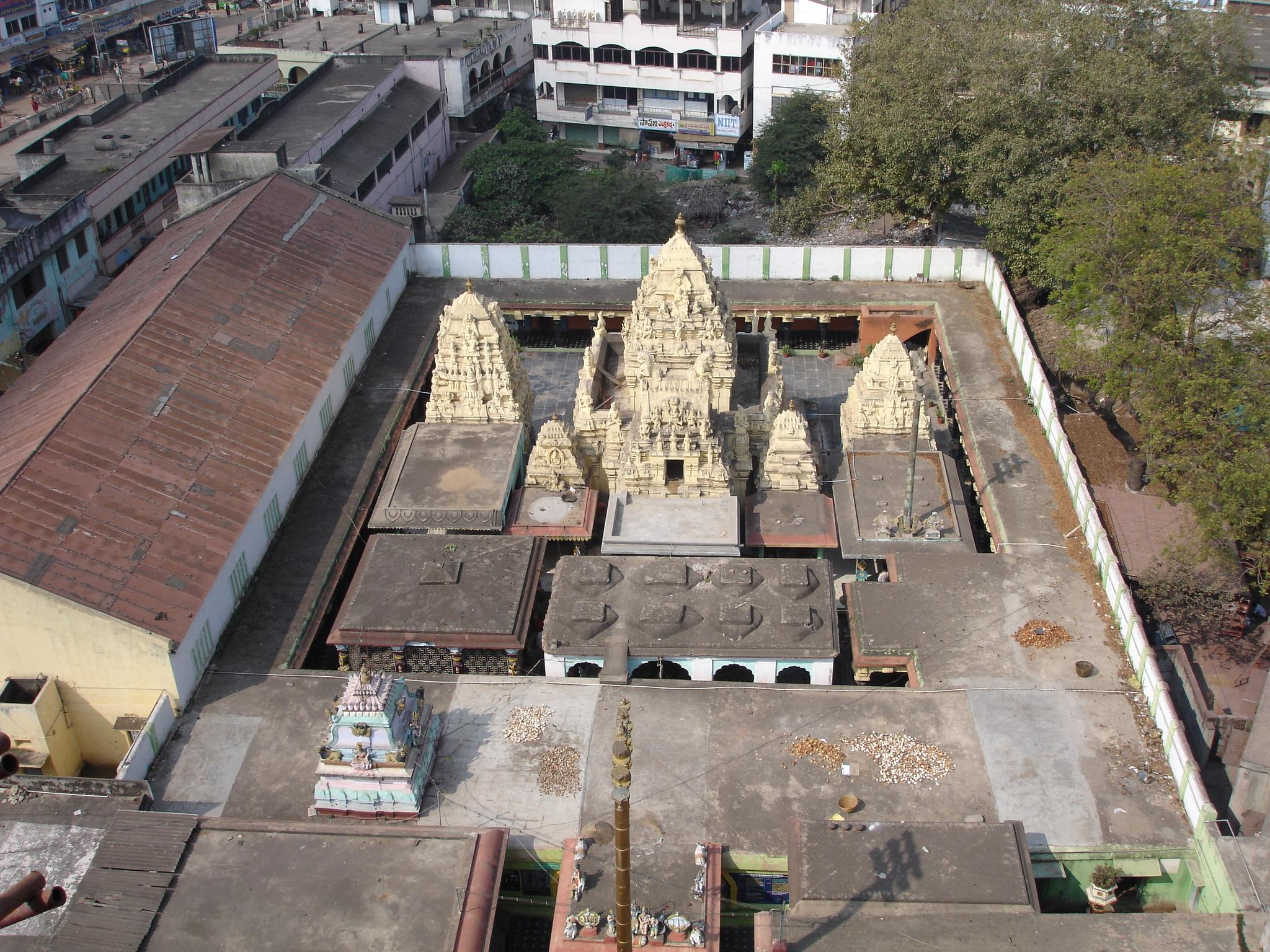
- Ksheera Ramalingeswara Swamy temple

- Location within Andhra Pradesh

Religion
- Affiliation: Hinduism
- District: West Godavari
- Deity: Shiva, Parvathi
- Festival: Maha Shivaratri

Location
- Location: Palakollu
- State: Andhra Pradesh
- Country: India
- Interactive map of Ksheerarama
- Coordinates: 16.5333°N 81.7333°E

Architecture
- Creator: Chalukya Bheema
- Completed: 14th century
- Temple: 1

Ksheerarama is one of the five Pancharama Kshetras that are sacred to the Hindu god Shiva. The temple is located in Palakollu of West Godavari in the Indian state of Andhra Pradesh. Shiva is known locally as Ksheera Ramalingeswara Swamy. It is believed that staying one day in Kshirarama is equivalent to staying one year in Varanasi. It is one of the centrally protected monuments of national importance.

It is one of the five powerful Shiva temples in Southern India that form the "Pancharama Kshetram". The remaining four are Somarama Temple in Bhimavaram; Draksharama Temple in Draksharamam; Kumararama Temple in Samalkota; and Amareswara Temple in Amaravati, state of Andhra Pradesh.

== Architecture ==
The tower is one of the tallest among the temple towers in Andhra Pradesh. The height of the temple is 120 ft and 9 floors and was constructed during the Chalukya period (9th century) during the reign of Chalukya Bheema.

The Lingam is a unique milky white in colour and the tallest. There are 72 pillars made of black stone in the temple mandapa. Inside, the Garbhagriha. the sanctums of Gokarneswara and Ganesha are at the left. The main deity is in the center. To the right are the sanctums of Kartikeya and Vishnu; Nandi is at the centre.

The Gostani River flows through Palakollu and there is a sangam (confluence) near Narsapur with the Godavari River. From here the river empties into the sea at Antarvedi. The lingam, can be seen from the windows of the sanctum from all four sides.

The temple complex has many shrines, for many gods and goddesses like, Surya, Parvati, Lakshmi, Nagareshwara, Ganesha, Veerabhadra, the eight Matrikas, Durga, Brahma, Saraswati, Kartikeya, Bhairava, Nagadeva, Nataraja, Dattatreya, Nageshwara, Shani, Krishna and Radha, and Shiva.

== History ==
The Prakara was designed by Sri Velupathi during the 10th century. The construction technique resembles those built during the Chalukya Agnikuls period. Gopuram was constructed under the direction of sri Alladu Reddy during the 14th century. During the 17th century, Kalyana mantapam (choultry) and Ashtha Bhuja Lakshmi Narayanaswamy alaya were constructed.

== Festivals ==
Mahasivaratri is an important festival when thousands of people offer prayers to seek the blessings of the Ksheera Ramalingeswara Swamy to attain Mukti.

== Transport ==
This temple is near the main bus station. Palakollu is connected to Indian Railways; the nearest railway station is Palakollu.

== Photo gallery ==
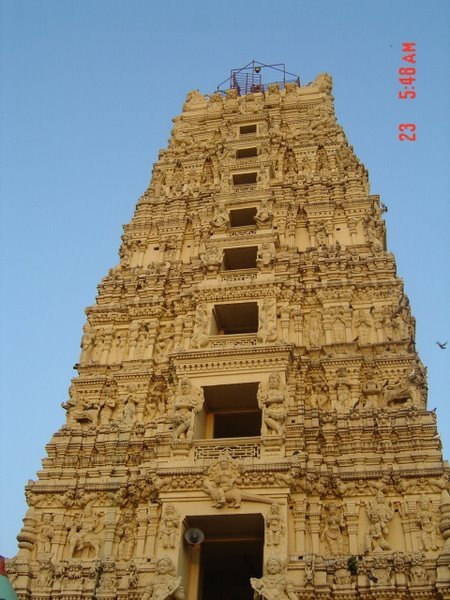
Ksheerarama temple tower is the tallest in Andhra Pradesh at 120 ft.
