= Sri Potti Sriramulu bus station =

Bus station in Andhra Pradesh, India

Sri Potti Sriramulu Bus Station Palakollu Bus Complex
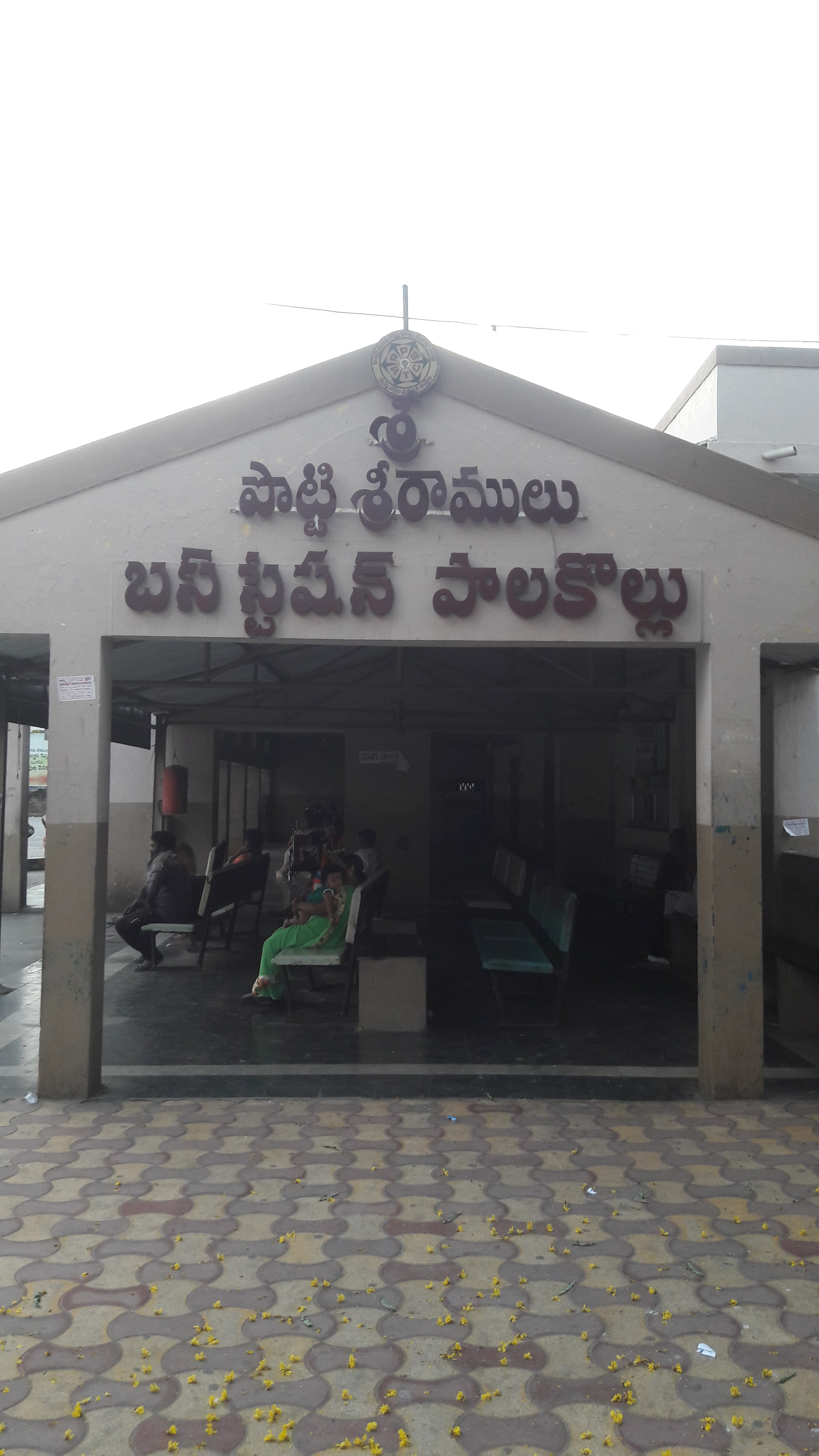

General information
- Other names: Palakollu bus station
- Location: Palakollu, West Godavari District, Andhra Pradesh, India
- Owner: APSRTC
- Platforms: 18

Construction
- Parking: Yes

Other information
- Station code: PKL

Services
08814-222848

Sri Potti Sriramulu bus station is a bus station located in Palakollu city of the Indian state of Andhra Pradesh. It is owned by Andhra Pradesh State Road Transport Corporation. This is one of the major bus stations in the district, with services to all towns and villages in the district and also to nearby cities in the state.

== Gallery ==
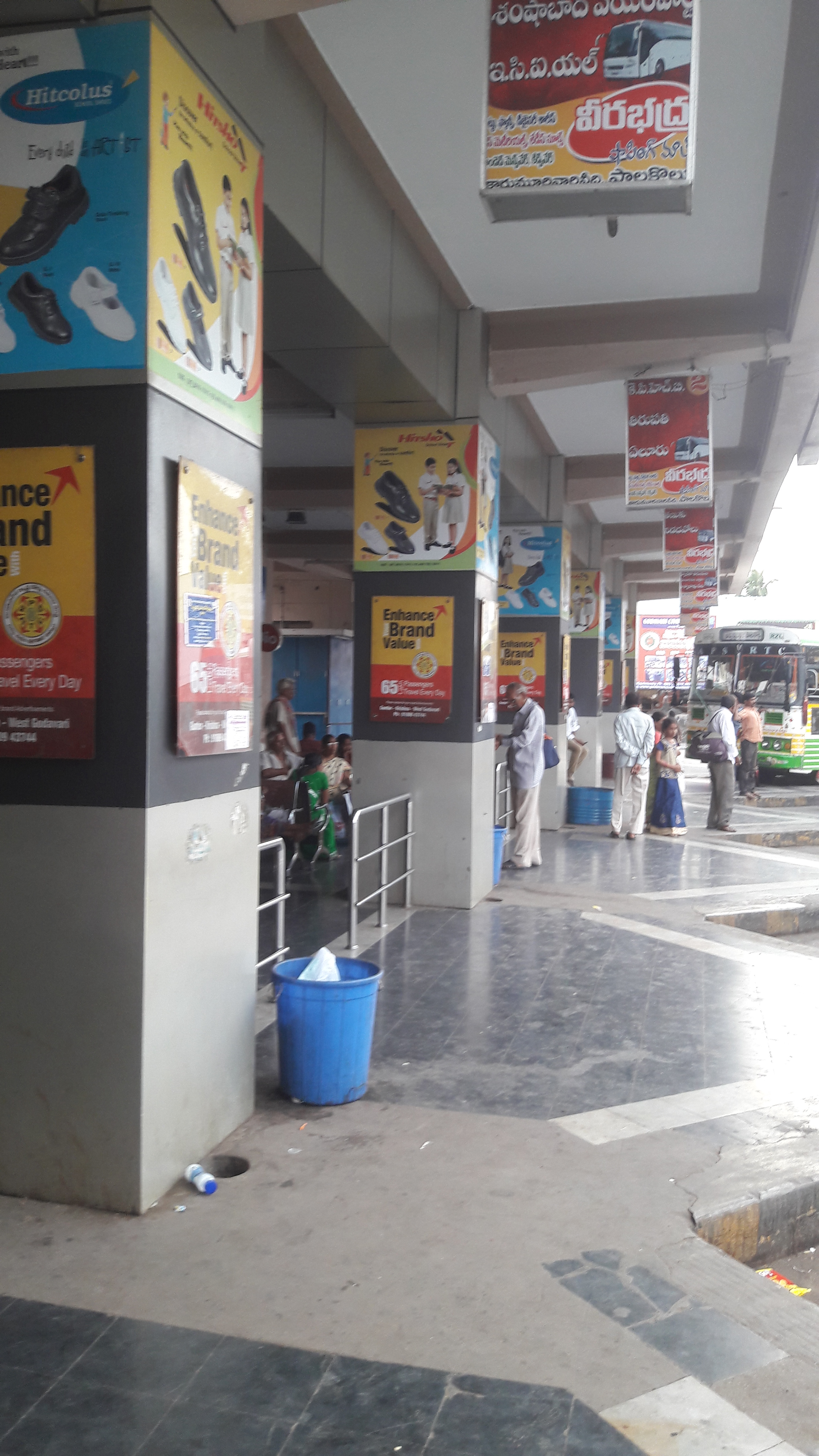
Palakollu bus station phase 1 platforms
