= Pancharama Kshetras =

Ancient Indian Hindu temples

Locations of Pancharama Kshetras in Andhra Pradesh

The Pancharama Kshetras (Telugu: పంచారామలు, romanized: Pañcārāmalu) or the Pancharamas, are a group of five ancient Hindu temples dedicated to Lord Siva, located in the Indian state of Andhra Pradesh. These temples are situated at Draksharamam, Samalkota, Amaravathi, Palakollu, and Bhimavaram. According to regional legend, the lingams in these temples are believed to have been created from a single unified Siva lingam.

== History ==
The Pancharama temples are located in the Godavari and Krishna river regions of Andhra Pradesh. These five Siva temples are situated at Draksharamam (Konaseema district), Samarlakota (Kakinada district), Amaravathi (Palnadu district), Palakollu, and Bhimavaram (West Godavari district). All the temples, except the one at Amaravathi, are located within the Godavari region.

Legend attributes the founding of the Pancharama temples to Indra. However, there is no evidence to suggest that all five temples were constructed at the same time. No foundation inscriptions have been found to provide definitive dates for their establishment or consecration. It is generally believed that each temple was established between the 10th and 11th centuries. Historical records, including inscriptions and literary references, suggest that these temples have been collectively referred to as the Pancharamas since the 12th century.

Historian K. V. Soundara Rajan attributes the construction of the five Siva shrines at Chebrolu, Samalkot, Draksharamam, Amaravathi, and Palakollu to Chalukya Bhima I (888–918 CE), the Eastern Chalukyan king during his reign. However, there is no concrete evidence supporting the idea that all five temples were built by Bhima I. And, the Bhimeswara temple at Chebrolu, despite its early architectural features, is not mentioned in medieval records as part of the Pancharama group of temples.

=== Kumararama, Samarlakota ===
The Bhimeswara temple at Samarlakota is attributed to Chalukya Bhima I (888–918 CE), the Eastern Chalukyan king. The temple is located near Chalukya Bhimavaram, close to Samalkota. An inscription found at Pithapuram credits Chalukya Bhima with its construction, describing him as the son of Vikramaditya, who ruled for 30 years and is said to have won 360 battles. Although some scholars propose that Chalukya Bhima II (934–945 CE) may have been responsible for the temple's construction, most evidence supports Chalukya Bhima I as its founder.

=== Draksharama, Draksharamam ===
The Bhimeswara temple at Draksharama is traditionally attributed to Chalukya Bhima I, though this lacks epigraphical support. An inscription from the reign of Amma II (945–970 CE) mentions an official named Kuppanarya, who constructed a Siva shrine at Draksharama named Kuppesvara, though no temple by that name exists now. The earliest inscription at the Bhimesvara temple, dated 1081 CE, indicates its existence before this time. Another inscription from 982 CE mentions the temple, suggesting it was built in the early 10th century, possibly during Kuppanarya's time.

=== Amararama, Amaravathi ===
The Amareswara temple at Amaravathi can be dated based on epigraphical and historical evidence. Of the 35 inscriptions on its walls, the earliest is from 1129 CE. While its Dravidian architectural style resembles the 10th-century Bhimesvara temples at Samalkot and Draksharama, the absence of earlier inscriptions suggests the temple was built later. Scholars estimate that the temple likely originated in the 11th century. Over time, legends associated with the Bhimesvara temples may have linked them to the Amareswara temple.

=== Ksheerarama, Palakollu ===
The Ksheera Ramalingeswara temple at Palakollu is traditionally associated with Narēndra Mrugarāja (Vijayaditya), who, according to the Edarupalli copper plate grant, built the Siva temple after fighting 108 battles. The temple, part of the pācharama shrines, is a single-storey structure with a small linga, unlike the usual two-storey shrines. Of the forty-six inscriptions on the temple, the earliest dates to 1156 CE, with the latest recorded in 1640 CE. Based on the epigraphical evidence, the temple is believed to have been constructed in the 11th century CE.

=== Somaramam, Bhimavaram ===
The Someswara temple at Bhimavaram is associated with the legend of Tarakasura, where a piece of the Sivalinga, which fell from his neck, was installed by Chandra. The earliest inscription found in the temple dates to the reign of Eastern Chalukyan king Saktivarma I (1001–1011 CE), placing the temple's construction in the 10th century. However, architectural features suggest it underwent renovations in later periods, indicating a slightly later date than other Pancharama temples.

== Legend ==
As per regional tradition, a lingam was owned by the asura king Tarakasura. Due to his possession of the lingam, he was invincible in battle. In the war between the devas and the asuras under Tarakasura, Kartikeya and Tarakasura met in combat. Kartikeya used his weapon of shakti to kíll Tarakasura. By the power of this weapon, the body of Tarakasura was torn to pieces. But to the astonishment of Kartikeya, all the pieces reunited to give rise to a revived Tarakasura. He repeatedly broke the asura's body into pieces, and yet the pieces re-unified repeatedly.

Even as Kartikeya grew baffled, Vishnu appeared before him and informed him that Tarakasura would be resurrected as long as the lingam he wore on his form was intact, and hence the lingam would have to be shattered for his victory. The deity also stated that after breaking, the pieces of the lingam would try to reunite. To prevent the lingam from reuniting, all the pieces would have to be established in the places where they would fall, by way of worshipping them and building temples over them.

Heeding the words of Vishnu, Kartikeya used his agneyastra (a celestial weapon of fire) to break the lingam that was worn by Tarakasura. The lingam broke into five pieces, and started to reintegrate to the chant of the sacred syllable Om. Surya, by the order of Vishnu, established the pieces where they fell and worshipped them by building temples over them. After the consecration of the temples, the pieces stopped their attempts to reunite and became famous as the Pancharama Kshetras. All the five lingams in these five places have scale-like marks on them, which are believed to have formed by the power of the agneyastra used by Kartikeya.

== Temples ==
These places (or Aramas) are as follows:

- Amararama (in Amaravathi): Amaravathi is in the Guntur district, on the banks of the Krishna River. The deity Amara Lingeswara is believed to have been worshipped by Indra here. The temple is old and in three circles with many temples within the compound. Bala Chamundeswari is the goddess venerated here. The Venu Gopala Swami temple is also located in the campus of the main temple.
- Draksharama (in Draksharamam): This is near Ramachandrapuram. The temple is very big and has three circles as compounds. It is under the control of the Archeological department. Rama is regarded to have worshipped Shiva here, followed by Surya and Indra. Manikyamaba devi, one of 18 Shakti Pithas, is present here.
- Somarama (in Bhimavaram): The Someswara Swami temple is in Gunupudi. The temple has a holy pond called the Chandra kundam in front of the temple. Chandra is believed to have absolved himself of his sins here by worshipping Shiva here. Hence, the name of the deity here is called Someswara. The lingam is believed to change its colour according to the lunar month (black at the time of amavasya, white at the time of purnima). The Annapurna Mata temple is located on the second floor.
- Ksheerarama (in Palakollu): According to local legend, the deity Ksheera Rama Lingeswara offered the Sudarshana Chakra to Vishnu here. The sage received boons and milk from Shiva, hence the name kshira (milk). Parvati is the name of the goddess here.
- Kumararama (in Samalkota): The Kumara Bhimeswara Swami temple is in Samalkota. It is about 20 km from Kakinada. It is a very old temple under the control of the Archeological department. Kartikeya is regarded to have established the lingam here, hence the name Kumararama. Bala Tripura Sundari is the goddess worshipped here.

Arama name	image	Deity's name	Consort name	Installor's name	Location	Established period	District
Amararama		Amaralingēśvara Śwāmivāru	Bālā Chāmuṇḍikā Ammavāru	Indra	Amaravati	11th century	Palnadu district
Draksharama		Bhīmēśvara Śwāmivāru	Māṇikyāmba Ammavāru	Surya	Draksharama	10th century	Konaseema district
Somarama		Sōmēśvara Śwāmivāru	Śrī Rājarājēśvari Ammavāru	Chandra	Bhimavaram	10th century	West Godavari district
Ksheerarama		Kṣīra Rāmalingēśvara Śwāmivāru	Pārvati Ammavāru	Vishnu	Palakollu	11th century	West Godavari district
Kumararama		Kumāra Bhīmēśvara Śwāmivāru	Bālā Tripura Sundari Ammavāru	Kartikeya	Samalkota	10th century	Kakinada district

== See also ==
- Samarlakota
- Draksharamam
- Amaravati
- Bhimavaram
- Palakollu
