= Narayanaswamy =

Narayanaswamy is a surname and a given name. Notable people with the name include:

Surname:

- A. Narayanaswamy, Indian politician
- Bandi Narayanaswamy, Telugu writer, novelist and teacher
- C. Narayanaswamy, Indian politician, Member of Parliament
- K. S. Narayanaswamy, (1914–1999), Carnatic veena exponent of the Thanjavur style
- K. V. Narayanaswamy (1923–2002), Indian musician and Carnatic music vocalists
- K. Y. Narayanaswamy, Kannada poet, scholar, critic and playwright
- Madala Narayanaswamy (1914–2013), Indian politician
- P. S. Narayanaswamy (1934–2020), Carnatic music vocalist
- R. Narayanaswamy, Indian accountant and educator
- Raju Narayanaswamy (born 1968), Indian Administrative Service officer
- Umayalpuram K. Narayanaswamy (1929–1997), Carnatic classical percussionist
- Y. A. Narayanaswamy (born 1964), Indian politician
- Yerra Narayanaswamy (1931–2023), Indian politician

Given name:

- K. Narayanaswamy Balaji, Indian medical scientist
- Narayanaswamy Balakrishnan, Indian aerospace and computer scientist
- Narayanaswamy Jayaraman (born 1964), Indian organic chemist, professor at the Indian Institute of Science
- Narayanaswamy Naidu, president of All India Farmers Association & Tamil Nadu Agriculturists Association
- Pathivada Narayanaswamy Naidu, Indian politician
- S. V. Narayanaswamy Rao, founder of Sree Ramaseva Mandali
- Narayanaswamy Srinivasan (born 1962), Indian molecular biophysicist, professor at the Indian Institute of Science
