= Daksharamam =

Hindu temple in India

Draksharamam
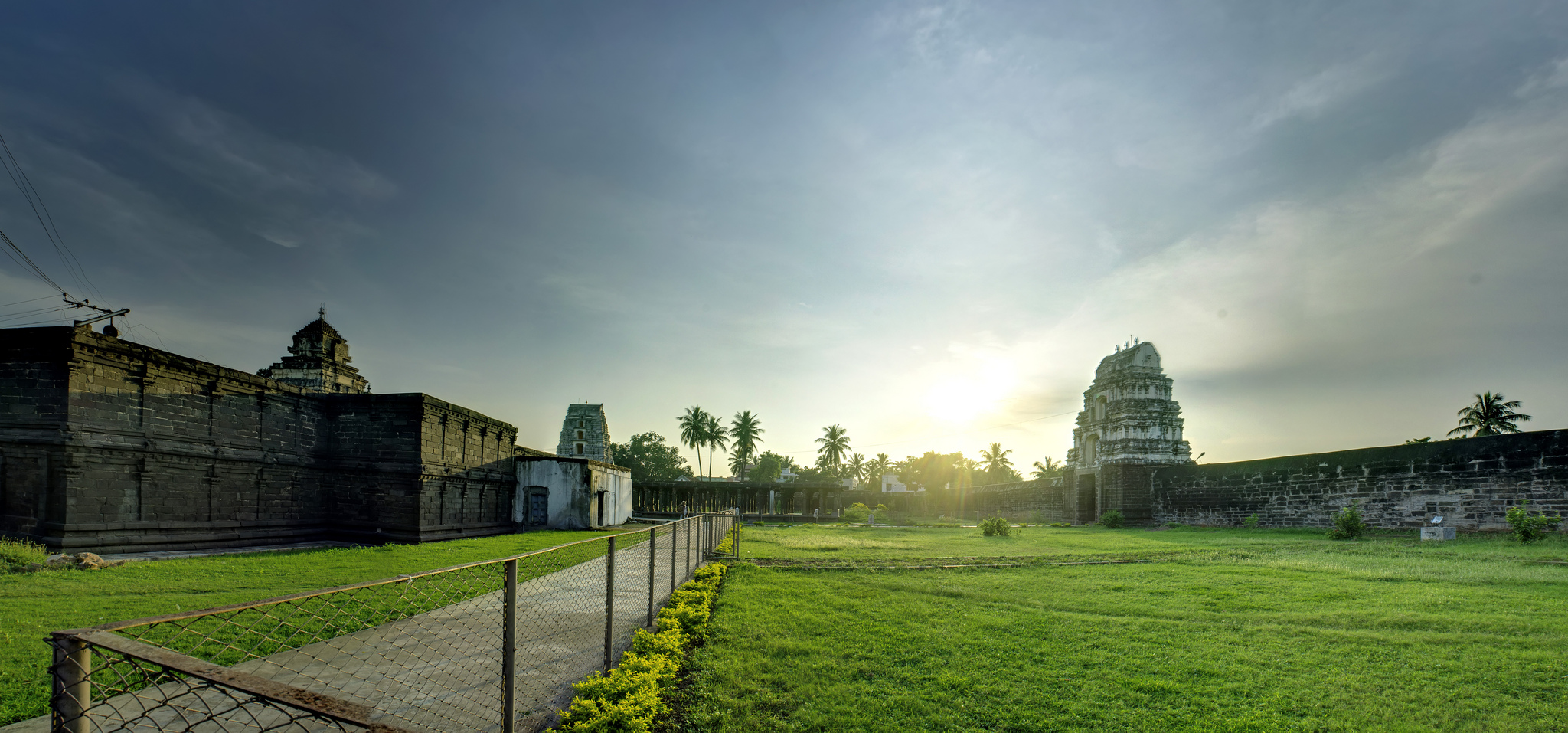
- Bhimeswara Swamy temple

- Location in Andhra Pradesh

Religion
- Affiliation: Hinduism
- District: Konaseema
- Deity: Shiva
- Festivals: Maha Shivaratri, Kartik Purnima

Location
- Location: Draksharamam
- State: Andhra Pradesh
- Country: India
- Interactive map of Draksharamam
- Coordinates: 16.792°N 82.0633°E

Architecture
- Type: Dravidian architecture

Specifications
- Temple: 1
- Inscriptions: Telugu
- Elevation: 31.4 m (103 ft)

Draksharamam or Daksharamam is one of the five Pancharama Kshetras, Trilinga Kshetras that are sacred to the Hindu god Shiva and also 12th of Ashtadasha Shakthi Peetams. The temple is located in Draksharamam town of Konaseema district in the Indian state of Andhra Pradesh. The poet Mallikarjuna Panditaradhyudu who wrote first independent work in Telugu and who spread Lingayatism in Andhra region during medieval ages was born in this town.

== Etymology ==
The town was formerly known as Daṣkatapovana and Daṣkavāṭika. This is the place where Daksha head of all prajapatis did a yagna called Nirīśvara yāga or Nirīśvara yajña. This place's present name is a compound of Daṣka and Ārāma which means "Abode of Daksha". This place was also referred to as Daṣkavāṭika by Jagadguru Adi Shankara in maha shakti peetha sloka at Māṇikye Dakṣa vāṭika which points to "Maanikyamba devi of Draksharama". The place where Daksha performed Nirīśvara yajña is still visited by pilgrims here.

== History ==
Inscriptions in the temple reveal that it was built between the 9th and 10th centuries CE by the Eastern Chalukyan king, Bhima. The big Mandapam of the temple was built by Ganga Mahadevi, daughter-in-law of Eastern Ganga Dynasty king Narasingha Deva I of Odisha. Architecturally and sculpturally, the temple reflects a blend of Chalukyan and Chola styles.

The temple is historically prominent. It was built by Eastern Chalukyas who reigned over this area. It's believed to have been constructed earlier to the Bhimeswaraswamy temple in Samarlakota that was built between 892 C.E. and 922 C.E.

== Festivals ==
Maha Shivaratri and Dasara are the main festivals associated with Draksharamam

== See also ==
- Andhra Vishnu
- Pancharama Kshetras

== Bibliography ==
- Salva, Krishnamurthi; Shu, Hikosaka; G., John Samuel (1994). A History of Telugu Literature: 1108 A.D.-1320 A.D. Institute of Asian Studies.
- K., Lalithamba (1978). "Devotional Saivism In Medieval Andhra". Indian History Congress. 39.
- Moorthy, K. K. (1994). The Aalayas of Andhra Pradesh: a sixteen-flower-garland. Message Publications.
- Rajguru, Padmashri Dr. Satyanarayana (1986). "No 1 - Ganga o Gajapati Bansha Ra Utpatti o Sankhipta Itihasa". Odisha Ra Sanskrutika Itihasa. Odisha Ra Sanskrutika Itihasa. Vol. 4. Cuttack, Odisha: Orissa Sahitya Akademi.
- Ramaswamy, Chitra (6 July 2017). "Rich in lore and sculptures". The Hindu. ISSN 0971-751X.
- Venkata Subbayya, ed. (1901), Śrī Bhīmēśvara Purāṇamu (PDF) (in Telugu), Madras: Krottapalli Venkata Padmanabha Sastri
