= Somarama =

Hindu temple dedicated to lord Shiva in Bhimavaram, Andhra Pradesh

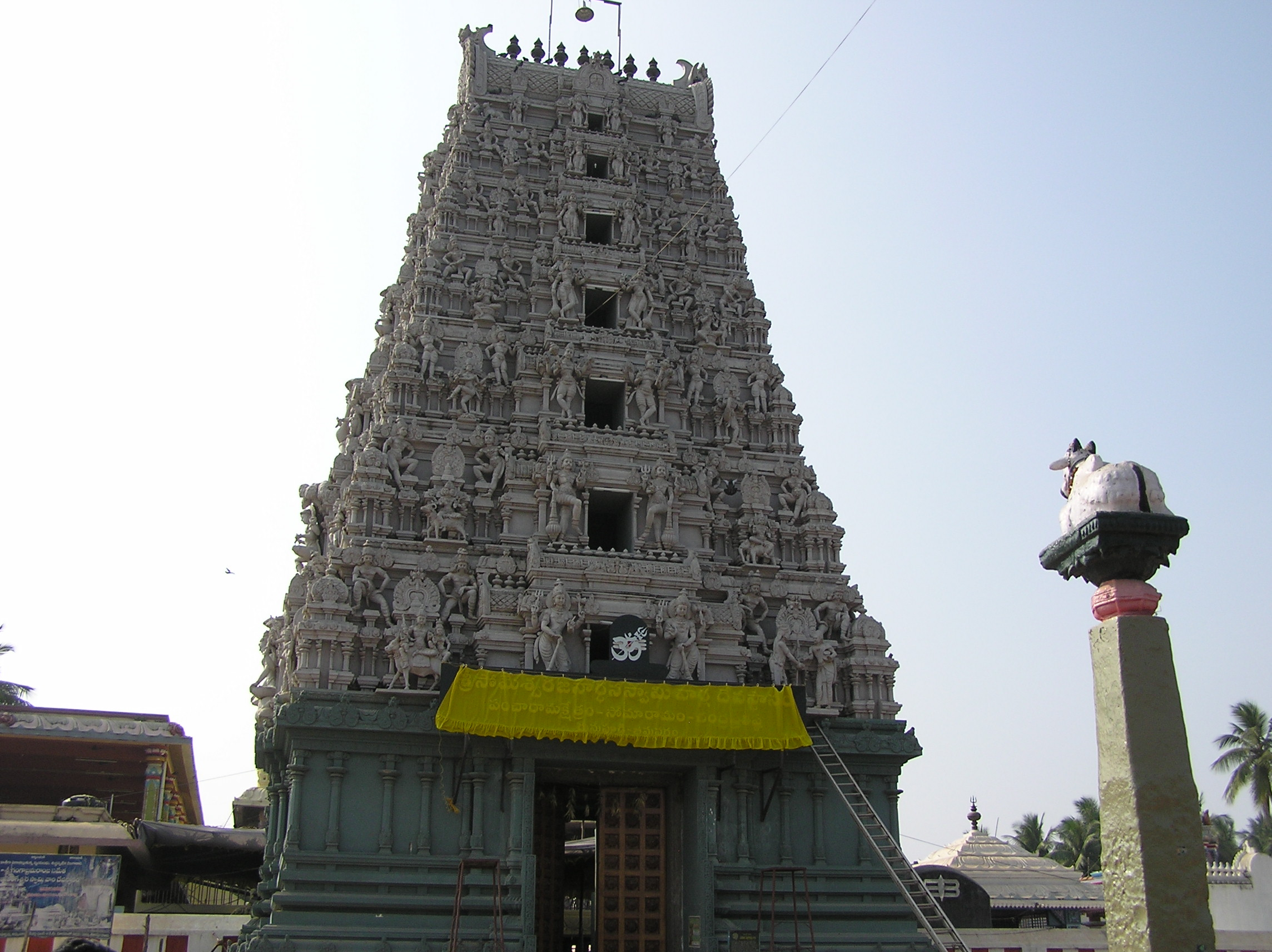
- Someswara Swamy temple

- Location in Andhra Pradesh

Religion
- Affiliation: Hinduism
- District: West Godavari
- Deity: Shiva
- Festivals: Mahasivaratri - February/March, Sarannavaratri – September/October

Location
- Location: Bhimavaram
- State: Andhra Pradesh
- Country: India
- Interactive map of Somarama
- Coordinates: 16°32′28.56″N 81°32′06.31″E

Somarama is one of the five Pancharama Kshetras that are sacred to the Hindu god Shiva. The temple is located in Bhimavaram of West Godavari district in the Indian state of Andhra Pradesh. It is one of the centrally protected monuments of national importance.

== Architecture and history ==
This temple is an old, however has newer paintings on the walls and sculptures.

At the front of the temple is a lotus covered pond called Chandrakundam. There is a large gopuram at the temple entrance. In the left side of temple, there is a big hall in which temples of the deities Rama and Hanuman are present.

On the right side of temple, there is an open hall above the temple office. When a crowd is present, pujaris/pandits conduct puja here for individuals. The temple has many sculptures. In the hall of temple, there is a big statue of Nandi. After crossing hall, there is a room in front of sanctum. In that room there is a temple of the goddess Annapurna.

In the sanctum, Shiva as Someswara Swamy is in the form of a linga. The linga is small in comparison to other Pancharamas. The linga is said to change its colour according to Lunar aspect. At the time of Pournami (full moon nights), the linga is white. During Amavasya (no moon nights), its colour is black.

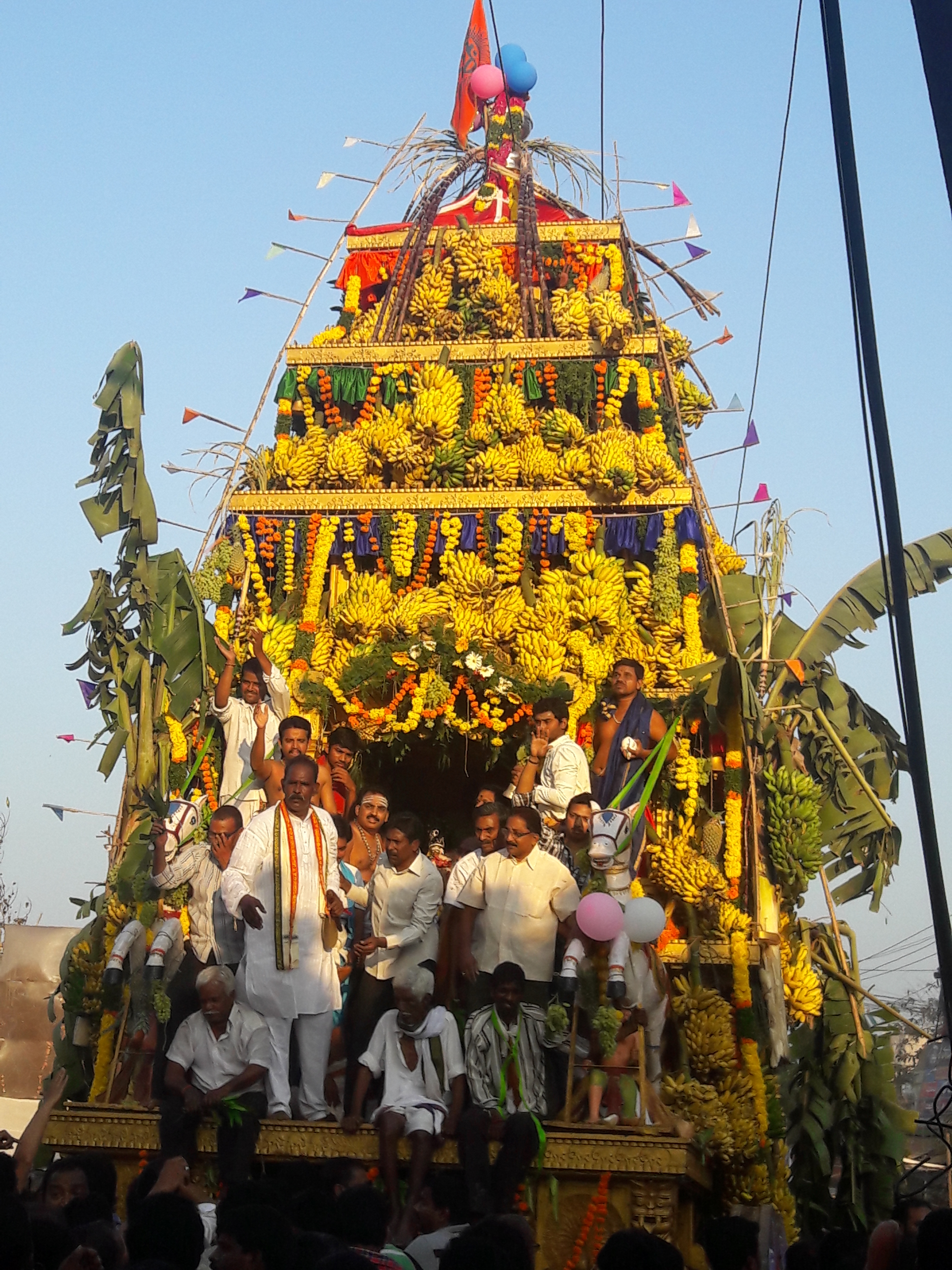
temple chariot during Mahasivarathiri festival

The temple of Annapurna was built on top of the Shiva sanctum. The goddess deviates from her usual iconography, wearing the sacred thread (usually worn by Hindu men) and having a baby near her feet.

The consort of Someswara is Rajarajeswari Ammavaru.

The linga is said to be installed and by the moon-god Chandra.

Maha Shivaratri and Sarannavarathri are the main festivals celebrated at this temple.

To the south of the sanctum, the goddess Adilakshmi can be seen and wedding hall at ground and first floor are constructed. Marriages are conducted both in the new hall and also in the Annapurna mantapam.

To the east side of this temple, there is a Pushkarini pond which is also called Soma Gundam. Inside the temple, Hanuman, Kumara Swamy, Navagraha, Surya and Ganesha can be seen. In front of the main entrance, a 15-foot pillar is constructed.
