= Palakollu =

Palakollu పాలకొల్లు Palakol, Palacole
- Town
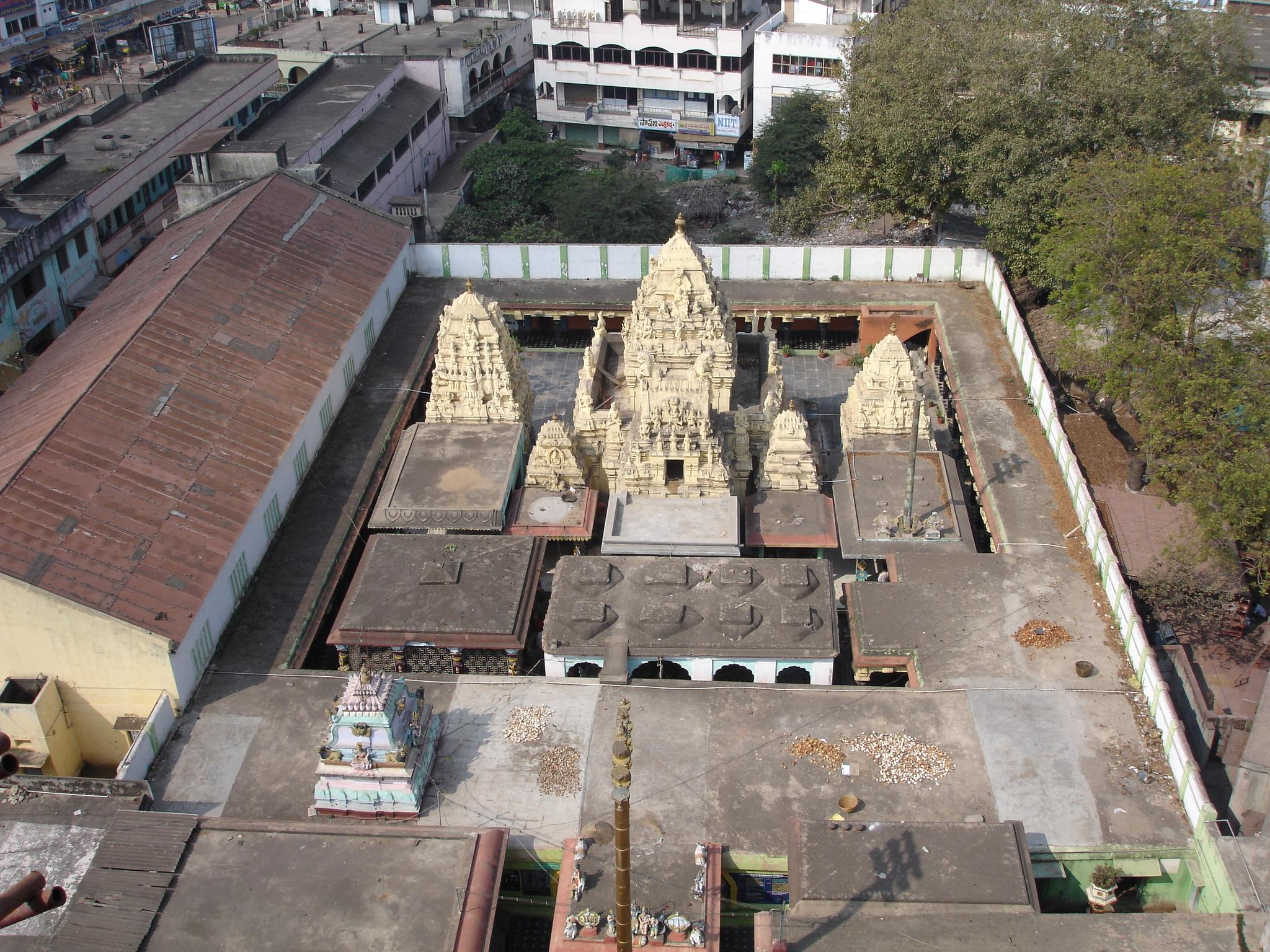
- Ksheera Ramalingeswara Swamy Temple

- Location in Andhra Pradesh, India Palakollu (India)
- Coordinates: 16.5167°N 81.7300°E
- Country: India
- State: Andhra Pradesh
- Region: Coastal Andhra
- District: West Godavari district
- Municipality constituted: 1 April 1919

Government
  - Type: Nagar Palika
  - Body: Palakollu Municipality (PMC); Eluru Urban Development Authority (EUDA)

Area
  - Total: 19.49 km^{2} (7.53 sq mi)
- Elevation: 1.5 m (4.9 ft)

Population (2011)
  - Total: 81,199
  - Density: 4,166/km^{2} (10,790/sq mi)

Languages
  - Official: Telugu
- Time zone: UTC+5:30 (IST)
- PIN: 534250–534267
- Telephone code: 08814
- Vehicle registration: AP 37
- Website: palakol.cdma.ap.gov.in

Palakollu is a town and the administrative headquarters of Palakollu Mandal in the Narasapuram revenue division of West Godavari district, Andhra Pradesh, India. Located in the Coastal Andhra region, the town's municipal area spans 19.49 square kilometres (7.53 sq mi).

As per the 2011 Census of India, Palakollu (municipality plus outgrowth) had a population of 81,199. Palakollu is also noted for Ksheerarama, one of the five Pancharama Kshetras.

== Etymology ==
Palakollu has historically been referred to by other names – "Upamanyapuram", "Ksheerapuri", "Palakolanu", and in English writings "Palacole" – which are mentioned in traditions associated with the local Sri Ksheera Ramalingeswara Swamy (Ksheerarama) temple.

== History ==
Palakollu (historically also written as Palakol) is referred to in sources by several earlier names, including Kṣīrārāma, Kṣīrapuram, Palakolanu, and Upamanyapuram.

In 1613, the Dutch established a trading factory at Palakollu as part of the Dutch Coromandel network; the post dealt in textiles, lamp oil, timber, roof tiles, and bricks and was temporarily abandoned in 1730. By the terms following the 1783 Treaty of Paris, the town passed to British control, with the Dutch continuing to rent it until 1804; it was restored to the Dutch in 1818 and finally ceded to the British again in 1824.

Palakollu is associated with the concept of Trilinga Deśam in regional tradition and is home to Kṣīrārāma (Sri Ksheera Rama Lingeswara Swamy Temple), one of the five Pancharama Kshetras dedicated to Shiva; the presiding deity is locally known as Ksheera Ramalingeswara Swamy.

=== Under the Qutb Shahi reign ===
==== Textile industry center ====
During the Golkonda Qutb Shahi period (16th–17th centuries), the Palakollu region participated in the Coromandel textile economy, producing cotton goods such as calicoes and blankets, including dyed fabrics routed via Machilipatnam for coastal and inland markets. A severe drought affecting the Krishna and Godavari deltas circa 1770, together with late‑18th‑century headwinds and 19th‑century competition from English mill‑made textiles, contributed to contraction in regional handloom activity noted in contemporary Dutch records.

==== Fabric and ironwork ====
Regional industrial linkages included nearby Narasapuram shipbuilding; scarcity of iron timbering in the Godavari delta limited ship construction to ancillary work, fostering ancillary ironwork such as nails and tools in and around Palakollu that supplied maritime yards.

== Geography ==
Palakollu is located at 16.5167°N 81.7300°E in West Godavari district, Andhra Pradesh, India. The town stands at an average elevation of about 5 metres (16 ft) above mean sea level on predominantly flat, deltaic terrain.

=== Climate ===
Palakollu has a tropical savanna climate (Köppen–Geiger Aw), with hot, humid summers and most annual precipitation falling during the monsoon months from June to October. Long‑term averages indicate a mean annual temperature of about 27.9 °C and annual rainfall around 1,208 mm; May is typically the warmest month and October the wettest.

Climate data for Palakollu
| Month | Jan | Feb | Mar | Apr | May | Jun | Jul | Aug | Sep | Oct | Nov | Dec | Year |
|---|---|---|---|---|---|---|---|---|---|---|---|---|---|
| Mean daily maximum °C (°F) | 27.7 (81.9) | 30 (86) | 32.8 (91.0) | 35 (95) | 37 (99) | 36.3 (97.3) | 32.4 (90.3) | 32.2 (90.0) | 32 (90) | 31 (88) | 28.8 (83.8) | 27.6 (81.7) | 31.9 (89.5) |
| Daily mean °C (°F) | 23.4 (74.1) | 25.4 (77.7) | 27.8 (82.0) | 30.5 (86.9) | 32.4 (90.3) | 31.8 (89.2) | 29 (84) | 28.9 (84.0) | 28.8 (83.8) | 27.8 (82.0) | 25.4 (77.7) | 23.5 (74.3) | 27.9 (82.2) |
| Mean daily minimum °C (°F) | 19.2 (66.6) | 20.9 (69.6) | 22.8 (73.0) | 26 (79) | 27.8 (82.0) | 27.3 (81.1) | 25.6 (78.1) | 25.6 (78.1) | 25.6 (78.1) | 24.6 (76.3) | 21.1 (70.0) | 19.4 (66.9) | 23.8 (74.9) |
| Average precipitation mm (inches) | 1 (0.0) | 6 (0.2) | 4 (0.2) | 7 (0.3) | 41 (1.6) | 145 (5.7) | 266 (10.5) | 190 (7.5) | 191 (7.5) | 286 (11.3) | 52 (2.0) | 19 (0.7) | 1,208 (47.6) |
| Average precipitation days | 1.2 | 0.2 | 0.2 | 0.4 | 1.6 | 3.0 | 6.1 | 6.4 | 5.4 | 8.7 | 9.1 | 3.7 | 46.0 |
Source: Climate‑Data.org

== Culture ==
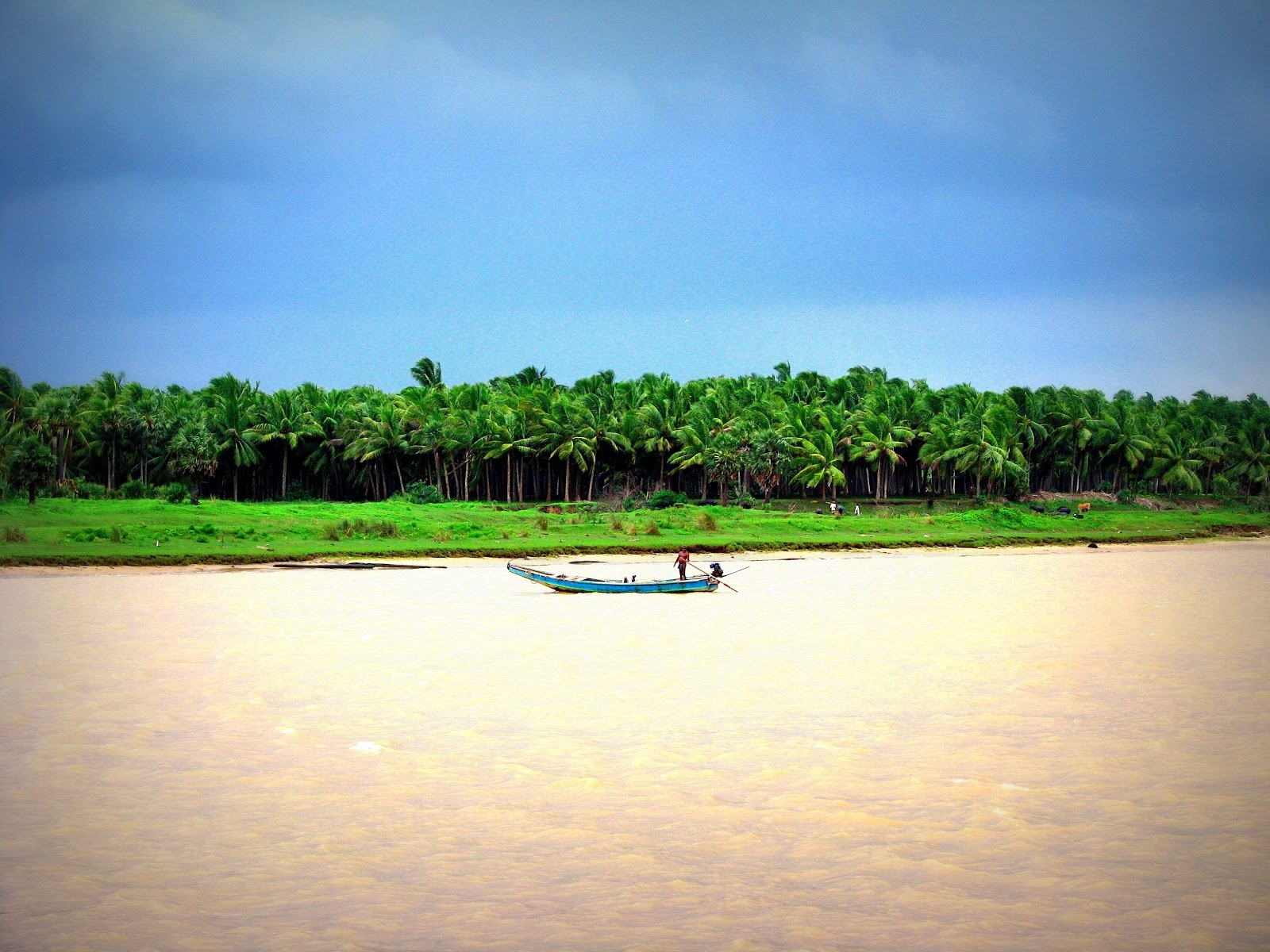
Palakollu near the Konaseema delta region

The Sri Ksheera Rama Lingeswara Swamy Temple (Ksheerarama)—considered one of the Pancharama Kshetras—serves as the hub of Palakollu's cultural life, drawing pilgrims for worship. Major festivals like Maha Shivaratri are celebrated here with great fervor, showcasing local traditions and devotional festivities.

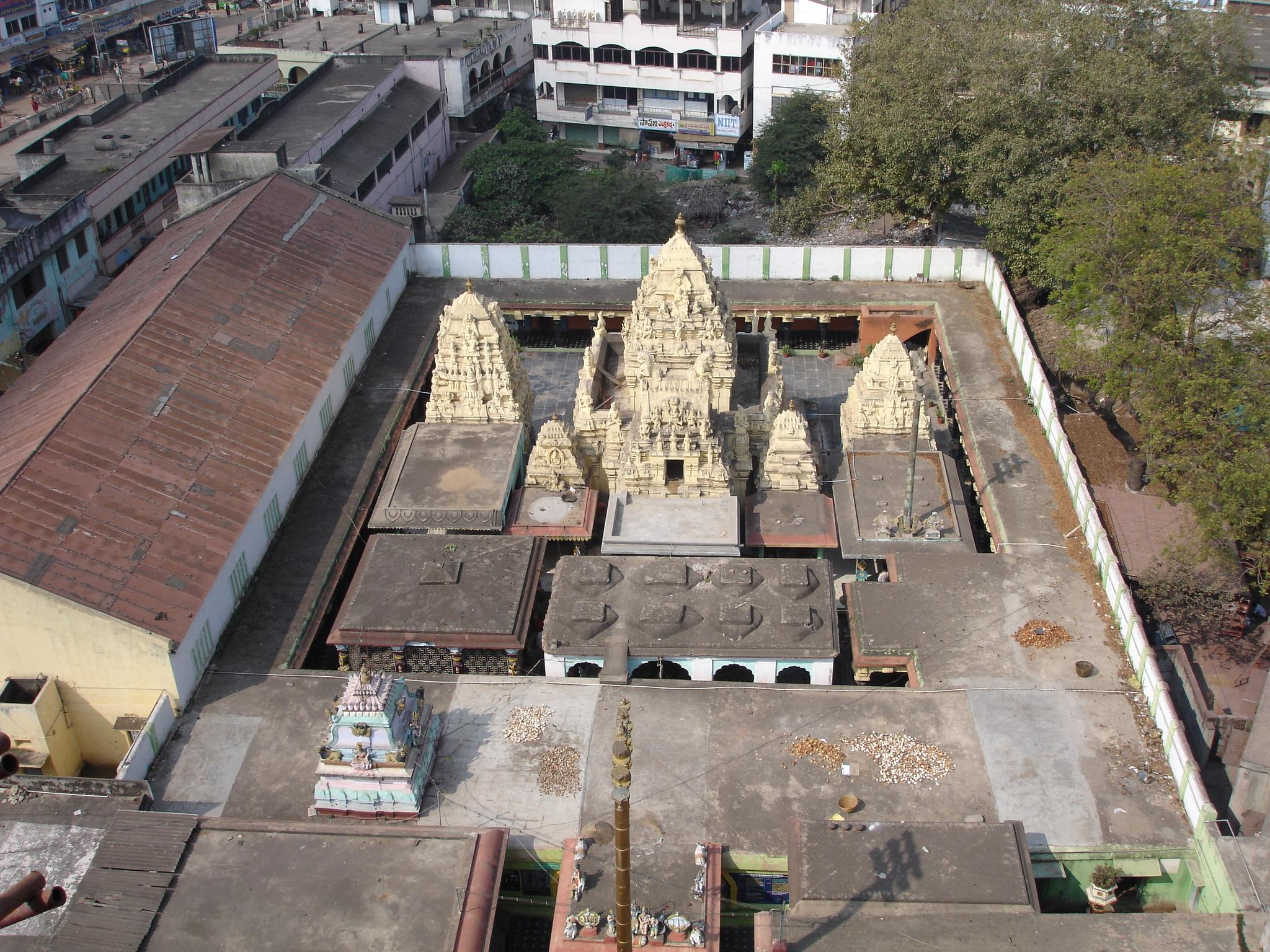
Sri Ksheera Rama Lingeswara Swamy Temple

== Administration ==
=== Municipality ===
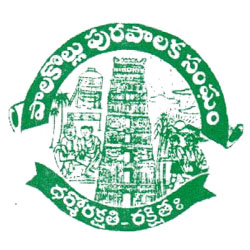
Palakollu Municipality official logo

The Palakollu Municipal Council (PMC) is the local self-government of the town. It was constituted as a municipality on 1 April 1919. The civic body's jurisdiction covers 19.49 km^{2} (7.53 mi^{2}) and comprises 32 municipal wards, each represented by an elected councillor. The elected council is headed by a municipal chairperson as presiding officer, while executive functions are vested in the municipal commissioner appointed by the state government.

PMC's functions include construction and maintenance of roads and drains; town planning and building regulation; upkeep of municipal markets and parks; solid waste management; registration of births and deaths; issuance of trade licences; property tax administration; and delivery of community welfare services such as maternal and child health and early childhood education.

The municipality was constituted in 1919 and was graded as a third‑grade municipality in 1952 before being upgraded to first grade in August 1965. On 1 January 2019, the Eluru Urban Development Authority (EUDA) was created under the Andhra Pradesh Metropolitan Region and Urban Development Authorities Act, 2016; Palakollu Municipality was brought within EUDA's planning jurisdiction thereafter.

Palakollu (Assembly constituency) is a legislative assembly constituency of Andhra Pradesh. Historical municipal leadership has included long‑serving chairpersons; specific tenures and projects require citations for verification.

=== E‑governance services ===
The Government of Andhra Pradesh operates MeeSeva centres to deliver citizen services locally and online, including digitally signed certificates (income, residence), land records, and other registrations with records stored in state databases.

=== Healthcare ===
Palakollu functions as a healthcare node for surrounding mandals in West Godavari district. The Government General Hospital serves Palakollu and nearby areas, alongside private multi‑specialty and single‑specialty clinics.

=== Politics ===
Palakollu Assembly constituency forms part of the Narasapuram (Lok Sabha constituency). Constituency boundaries and reservations are defined by the Delimitation of Parliamentary and Assembly Constituencies Order, 2008.

== Demographics ==
Historical population
| Year | Pop. | ±% |
|---|---|---|
| 1901 | 10,848 | — |
| 1911 | 12,953 | +19.4% |
| 1921 | 14,535 | +12.2% |
| 1931 | 16,906 | +16.3% |
| 1941 | 19,869 | +17.5% |
| 1951 | 23,037 | +15.9% |
| 1961 | 28,481 | +23.6% |
| 1971 | 36,196 | +27.1% |
| 1981 | 46,146 | +27.5% |
| 1991 | 56,969 | +23.5% |
| 2001 | 76,308 | +33.9% |
| 2011 | 81,199 | +6.4% |
Source: Census of India

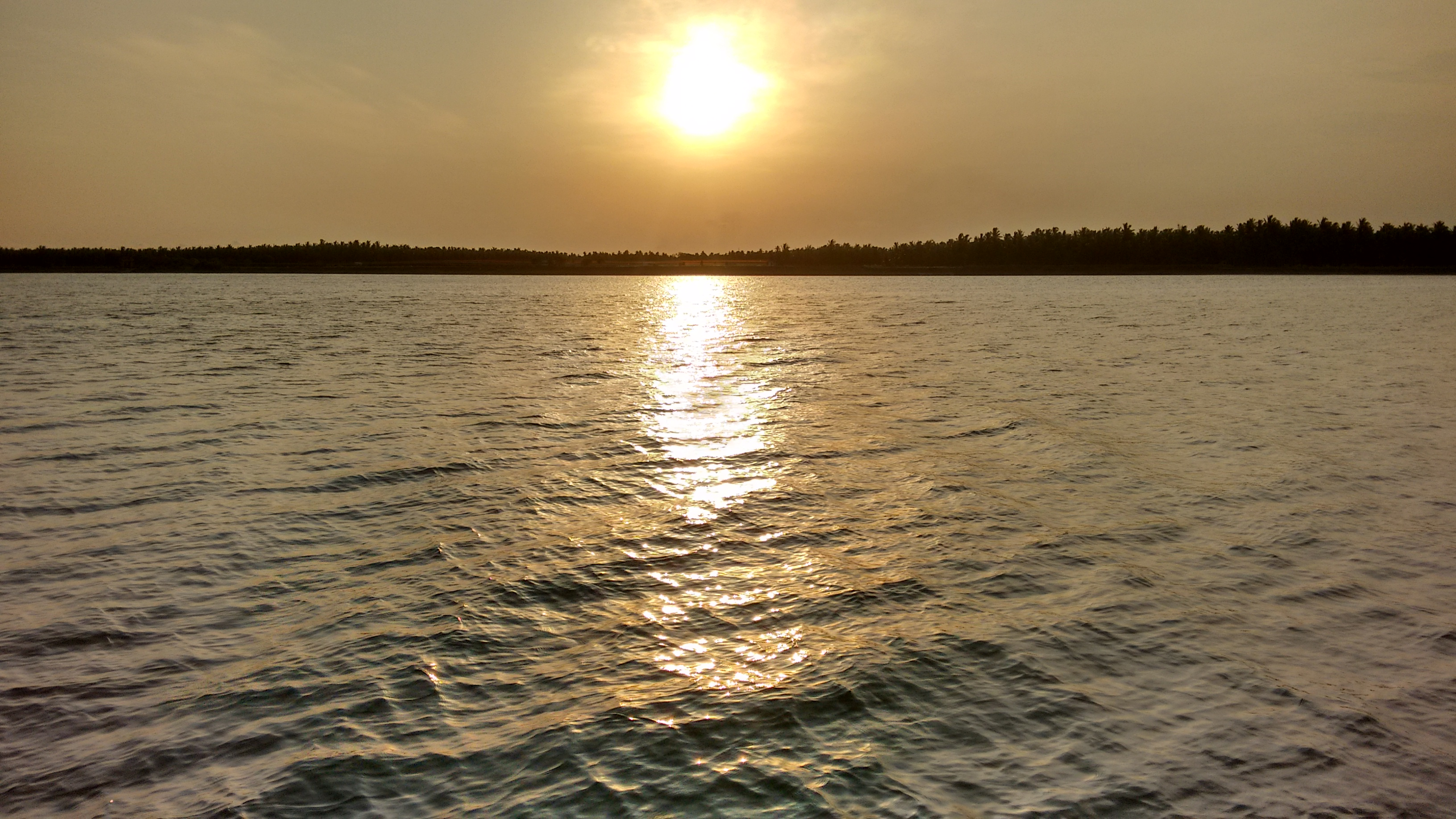
Palakollu

As of the 2011 Census of India, the town had a population of 81,199; 40,103 males and 41,096 females — a sex ratio of 1,024 females per 1,000 males. Children aged 0–6 years numbered 7,318 (3,743 boys and 3,575 girls; child sex ratio 955). The average literacy rate stands at 76.95%, above the then state average of 73.00%.

=== Language and religion ===
Telugu is the official language of administration and public instruction in Palakollu; other languages are used within minority communities.

According to the 2011 census, the religious composition of Palakollu was: Hindus (95.64%), Muslims (2.11%), Christians (1.97%), Jains (40 people), Sikhs (10 people), Buddhists (3 people); 143 people did not state a religion.

Religion in Palakollu (2011)
| Hinduism | 95.64% |
| Islam | 2.11% |
| Christianity | 1.97% |
| Others | 0.34% |

== Economy ==
Palakollu's economy is primarily agri-based, with food processing, rice milling, trading, and services supporting the town's role as a commercial centre for surrounding Godavari delta mandals. The town and nearby mandals also participate in coir-related activities and small-scale manufacturing aligned with delta agriculture and cottage industries.

Industries Small and cottage enterprises operate alongside agro-processing, including coir and allied units documented in regional industrial cluster plans for West Godavari district. Rice milling remains a significant activity in the Godavari delta, supplying local markets and distribution networks serving coastal Andhra Pradesh.

Aquaculture Aquaculture and inland fisheries are major occupations in the West Godavari region, including areas around Palakollu, with district programmes supporting marine, brackish, and inland fishery resources. Seasonal fishing in the Godavari estuary includes the prized pulasa (hilsa), noted in regional coverage for its local economic importance and seasonality.

== Tourism ==
Palakollu draws visitors for pilgrimage and regional excursions in the Godavari delta, notably to the Sri Kshiraramalingeswara Swamy Temple and nearby coastal and backwater destinations in West Godavari district.

Perupalem Beach on the Bay of Bengal is a popular coastal outing listed among the district's tourist places and is commonly visited on day trips from Palakollu. In the backwaters of the Vasishta Godavari within the broader Konaseema region, resort stays are marketed for river-facing leisure and cultural experiences near Palakollu; the operator notes Palakollu as a nearby urban center for access.

The Sri Kshiraramalingeswara Swamy Temple (Ksheerarama) in Palakollu is highlighted by district tourism as a key heritage and pilgrimage site.

== Transport ==
Palakollu is connected to regional destinations by road and rail, with onward air access via Rajahmundry Airport.

=== Roadways ===
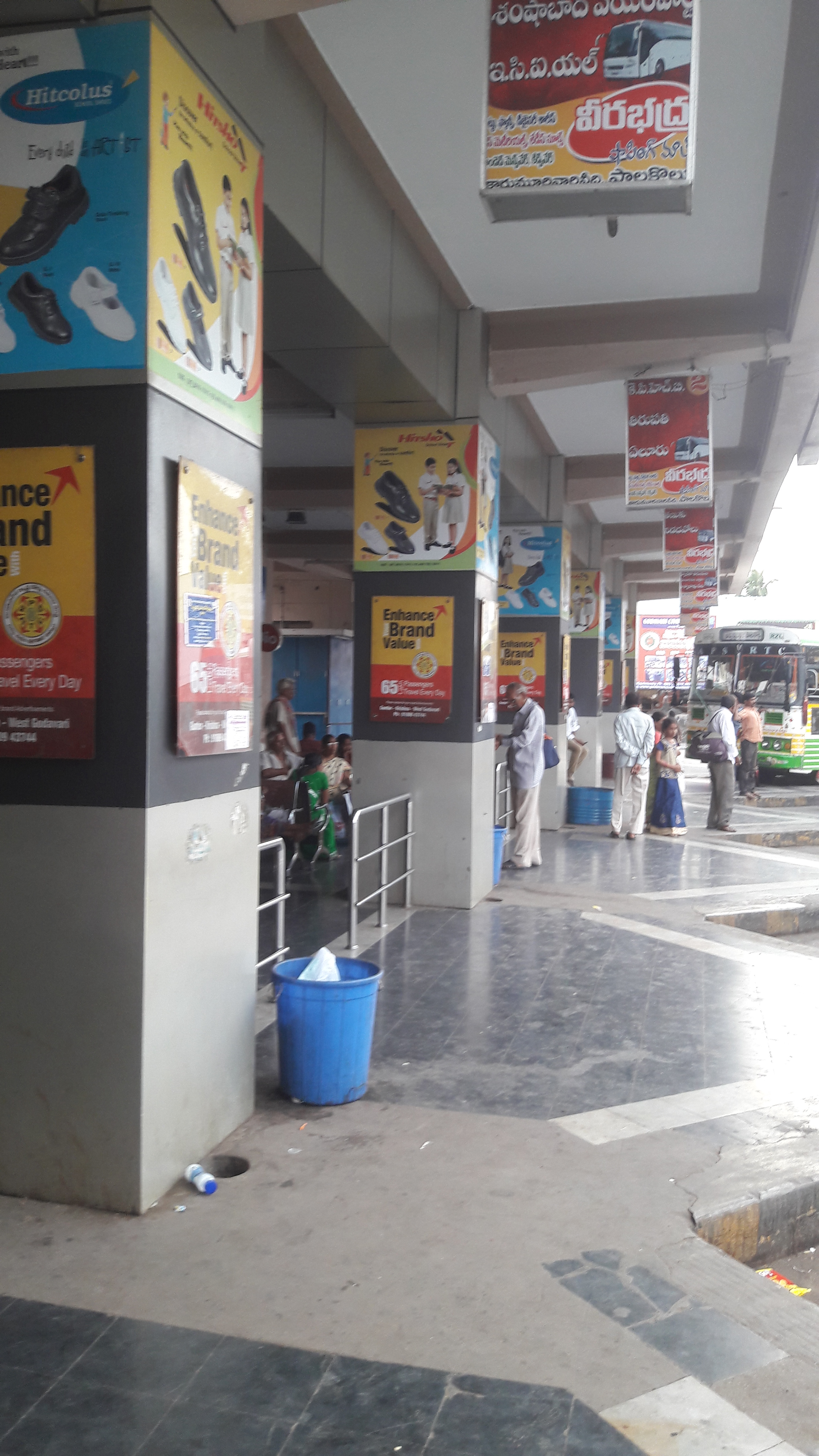
Palakollu bus station phase 1 platforms

The municipal road network in Palakollu totals 78.80 km (48.96 mi) across urban roads administered by the civic body.

=== Railways ===
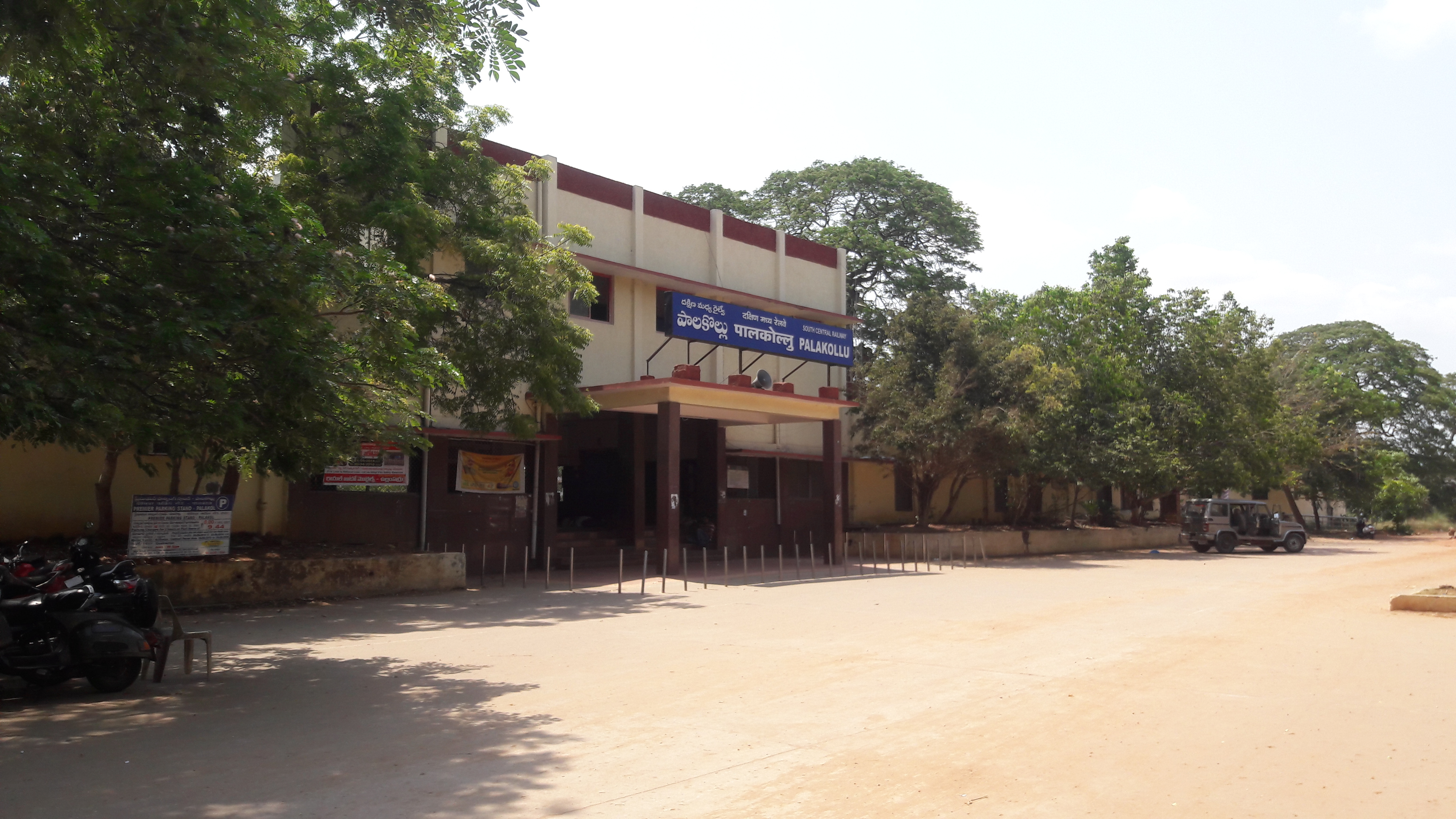
Palakollu Railway Station entrance

Palakollu railway station lies under the Vijayawada railway division and is classified as a B‑category station in the South Central Railway zone. The station is situated on the Bhimavaram–Narasapuram branch line and has been the subject of capacity works including additional platforms reported during the 2010s.

=== Waterways ===
National Waterway 4 (notified 24 November 2008) links inland waterways across Telangana, Andhra Pradesh, Tamil Nadu, and the Union territory of Puducherry, including reaches of the Godavari and Krishna and the Buckingham Canal. Development of NW‑4 was assigned to the Inland Waterways Authority of India with works and timelines announced by the central government in 2010.

=== Airways ===
Rajahmundry Airport (approximately 70 km by road) serves Palakollu with scheduled domestic flights; a new terminal became operational in May 2012, and runway extension works were undertaken to accommodate larger aircraft types.

== Education ==
Palakollu serves as an education hub for surrounding rural areas and towns in the West Godavari region, with municipal and state-run institutions alongside private schools and colleges. As per the 2011 Census of India, the town recorded an average literacy rate of 83.90%, with 63,097 literates (32,397 males; 30,700 females).

Primary and secondary education is provided by government, aided, and private schools under the School Education Department of Andhra Pradesh. The Palakollu Municipal Corporation lists its network of municipal schools and related civic education services for the urban area. According to state school information reporting for the mid‑2010s, the urban area had on the order of 150–160 recognized schools across government, residential, private, and municipal managements.

Instruction is commonly offered in Telugu and English, with Urdu available in select schools subject to state/CBSE affiliations and local demand. Palakollu and its vicinity host several higher‑education institutions spanning arts, science, commerce, engineering, and professional programs, including D.N.R. Educational Institutions and the Jogaiah Institute of Technology & Sciences (JITS).

== See also ==
- List of cities in Andhra Pradesh
- List of municipalities in Andhra Pradesh
