= Samarlakota =

- Town
- Samalkota
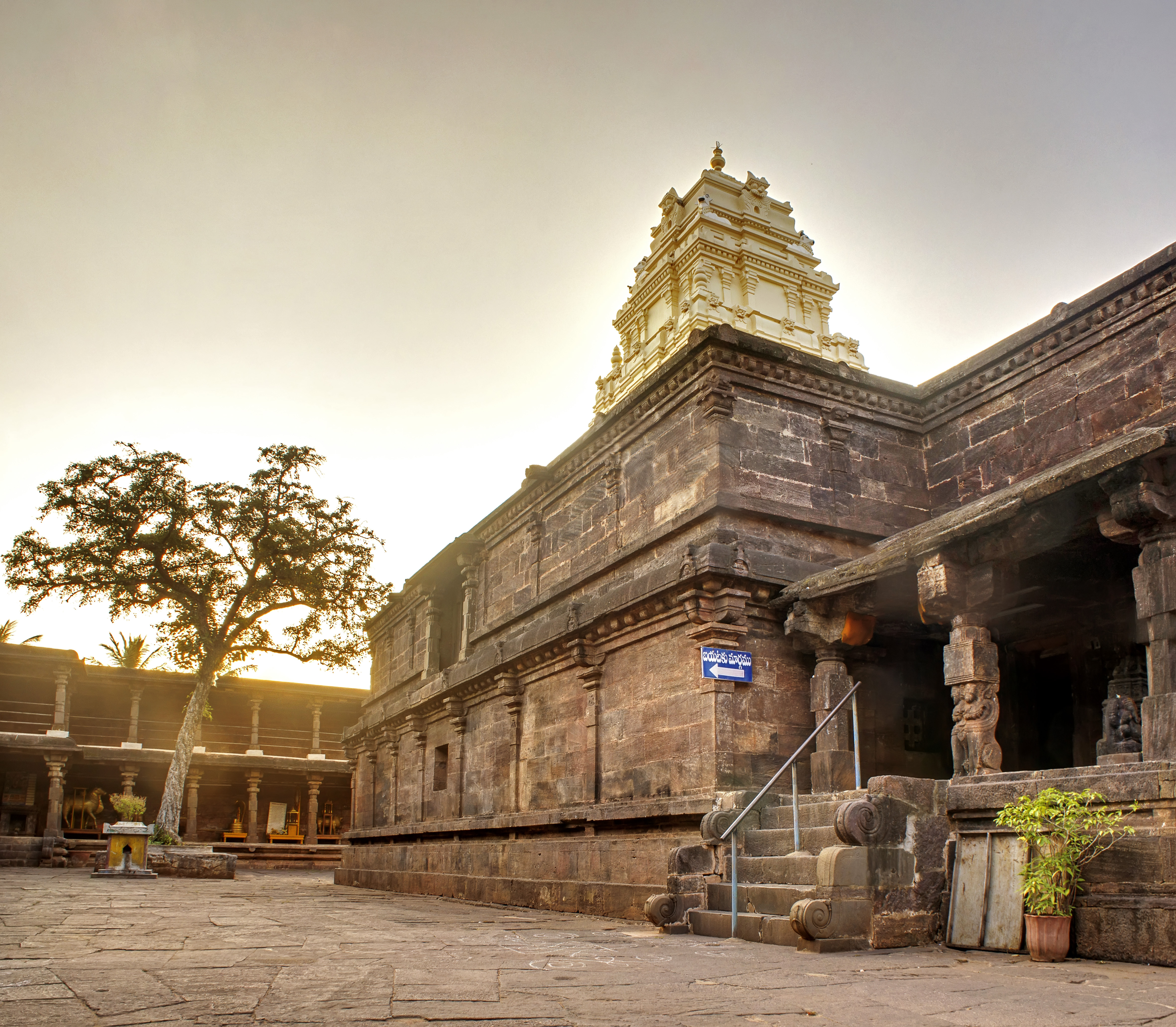

- Location in Andhra Pradesh, India
- Coordinates: 17.0531°N 82.1695°E
- Country: India
- State: Andhra Pradesh
- District: Kakinada district

Area
  - Total: 14.08 km^{2} (5.44 sq mi)
- Elevation: 9 m (30 ft)

Population (2011)
  - Total: 56,864
  - Rank: 3rd in East Godavari dist
  - Density: 4,039/km^{2} (10,460/sq mi)

Languages
  - Official: Telugu
- Time zone: UTC+5:30 (IST)
- PIN: 533 440
- Telephone code: +91-884
- Vehicle Registration: AP05 (Former); AP39 (from 30 January 2019)

Samarlakota is a town in Kakinada district of the Indian state of Andhra Pradesh. The town forms a part of Kakinada Urban Development Authority. Previously, it was known as Chamarlakota, which dates back to a local kaifiyat that was written in the mid-eighteenth century.

== History ==
Samarlakota, formerly known as Chamarlakota, was part of the Pithapuram estate and was strongly associated with the sirdar family that founded the zamindari. It is believed to have been the original capital of the estate before being temporarily replaced by Pithapuram. However, in the 18th century, Samalkot regained its status as the estate's capital.

The fort in Samalkot held strategic importance during the conflicts of 1759, serving as a focal point in the power struggles between the English, French, and local forces. The fort frequently changed hands during this period. Later, in the latter half of the 18th century, it became a sanitarium for British troops. Barracks were constructed in 1786, establishing Samalkot as the principal garrison of the British forces in the Rajahmundry region. However, the fort was demolished in 1838, and the military station was abandoned by 1868. Following the Rampa disturbances of 1879, a small British military presence was reestablished but was finally withdrawn in 1893.

Samalkot's commercial significance grew with the establishment of a large sugar refinery and distillery in 1899. The town also became a hub for the weaving industry, with many Devangas producing plain cotton cloths, including some with lace borders. Additional industries in the area included chintz-stamping, dyeing, and the production of kas-kas tattis.

Historically, Samalkot was connected by canal to Kakinada and Rajamahendravaram, facilitating transport and trade.

== Geography ==
Samarlakota is located at 17.0500°N 82.1833°E. It has an average elevation of 9 m (30 ft)

== Transport ==
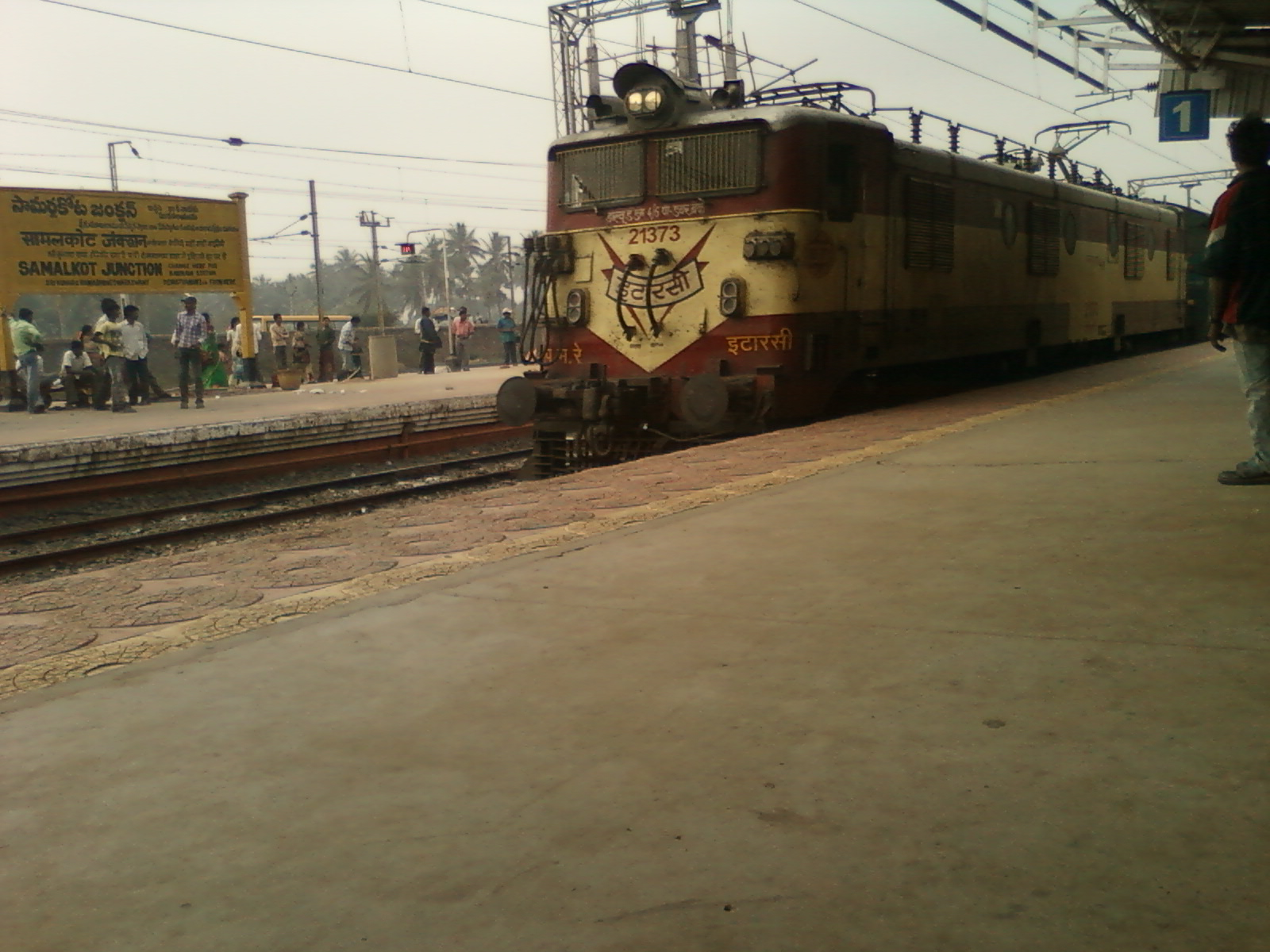
WAM 4 series loco at Samarlakota Junction

The Andhra Pradesh State Road Transport Corporation operates bus services from Samarlakota bus station. Samarlakota railway station is an important railway junction on the Visakhapatnam-Vijayawada section of Howrah-Chennai main line. The railway line to Kakinada branches at this railway junction. The nearest airport to Samarlakota town is Rajahmundry Airport, which is 40 km (25 miles) away.

== Demographics ==
Samarlakota is a town in the district of Kakinada, Andhra Pradesh. Samarlakota is divided into 18 wards, for which elections are held every five years. Samarlakota Municipality has a population of 56,864, of which 28,115 are males and 28,749 are females, according to a report released by Census India 2011.

The population of children aged six or younger is 5,793, which is 10.19% of total population of Samarlakota. In Samarlakota Municipality, the male:female sex ratio is 1,023 per 1,000 males, against state average of 993. The child sex ratio in Samarlakota is around 948 compared to the Andhra Pradesh state average of 939. The literacy rate of Samarlakota is 74.58%, higher than state average of 67.02%. Male literacy is around 78.77% while female literacy rate is 70.51%.

== Governance ==
Samarlakota municipality has over 16,044 houses to which it supplies basic amenities like water and sewerage. It is authorized to build roads within the municipality limits and impose taxes on properties coming under its jurisdiction.

== Economy ==
Manufacturing industries at an industrial estate include oil, food and spice manufacture; companies are Ammbati Subbanna & Co, AS Brand Oil, Arun Dorakula Food & Spices Company, and ADR brand, RAK Ceramics are situated in Samarlakota.

== Attractions ==
Religious organisations are:

- Sri Chalukya Kumararaama Sri Bheemeswara
- Mandavya Narayana Swamy Temple
- Swami vaari temple,
- Prasanna aanjaneya Swami temple
- Ganapati Temple,
- Mehar complex
- Mutyalamma temple
- Sai Baba Temple
- Station centre
- Municipal Centre
- Bhimavarampeta
- St.Anthony Shrine Catholic church
- Centenary Baptist Church,
- Augustana Lutheran church
- True Gospel church
- Andhra Baptist Churches

== Education ==
The town's first boarding school was established in 1882, by the Canadian Baptist Mission it was known as C. B. M. Boys' School. Notable among those who were associated includes A. B. Masilamani and his teacher Chetty Bhanumurthy.

Primary and secondary school education is imparted by government, aided and private schools, under the state's School Education Department. The medium of instruction followed by schools are English and Telugu.
