= Achampalli =

Achampalli may refer to:

- Achampalli (Mulbagal), village in Karnataka, India
- Achampalli (Srinivaspur), village in Karnataka, India
