= K. V. Iyer =

Indian gymnast, bodybuilder and author

- ಕೋಲಾರ ವೆಂಕಟೇಶ ಅಯ್ಯರ್
- K. V. Iyer posing with a discus
- Born: Kolar Venkatesh Iyer; 1897; Devarayasamudra, Kolar district, Mysore State, British India
- Died: 1980 (aged 82–83)
- Occupations: Gymnast, bodybuilder, author, physical education instructor
- Known for: A pioneer of Indian bodybuilding and modern yoga
- Notable work: Muscle Cult (1930), Roopadarshi, Shantala
- Awards: Physician to the Maharaja of Mysore

Kolar Venkatesh Iyer (1897-1980) was a gymnast, bodybuilder, proponent of Indian physical culture, and author of books including the 1930 Muscle Cult: A Pro-Em for My System. He contributed to the development of modern yoga as a system of exercise.

He was "possibly the most high-profile Indian advocate of physical culture in the first half of the twentieth century."

== Life ==
Kolar Venkatesh Iyer was born in the village of Devarayasmudra in Kolar District, Karnataka. His mother died when he was ten, and he went to school in Mysore, reaching the Intermediate level. Soon after that he began developing his own system of bodybuilding. He was a gymnast, bodybuilder, energetic and well-known proponent of Indian physical culture, and a contributor, like other gymnastics teachers such as Krishnamacharya, to the development of modern yoga. He consciously combined hatha yoga with bodybuilding in his Bangalore gymnasium, around 1930. He helped, too, to present the sequence of yoga asanas called Surya Namaskar, the Salute to the Sun, as a practical, modern, stretching exercise rather than as something spiritual. He toured India doing lecture-demonstrations, accompanied by the yoga guru Seetharaman Sundaram.

This helped to change the perception of yoga from a magical technique intended for the medieval and magical transformation of the body into something immortal, by conquering the five elements, to a view of the body from the point of view of looking good and being physically fit.

His first gymnasium was established in the Sultan's palace in Bangalore in 1922. He moved several times, finally in 1940 setting up the "famous" Vyayamsala on J. C. Road, Bangalore. He became "the most important Indian physical culture instructor of the time", attempting "to blend Yoga, Hindu mysticism, and occidental physical culture into something uniquely his own".

Iyer served also as physician to the Maharajah of Mysore. As well as promoting gymnastics, he vigorously promoted himself, appearing in magazines such as Health and Strength and The Superman, and describing himself as "India's most perfectly developed man" with "a body which Gods covet".

His students include Seetharaman Sundaram (1901–1994) who operated a Yogic School of Physical Culture and Ramesh Balsekar (1917–2009) an influential Advaitin philosopher.

== Personal life ==
Iyer was a vegetarian. His close friends included T. P. Kailasam and V. Seetharamaiah. The humorous playwright T. P. Kailasam, hearing from Iyer that he had not read anything by Oscar Wilde, replied "Oh my! You are only into body-building, what about your brain? You should prove to the world that a well-built body can harbour a creative mind too." The effect was to encourage Iyer to become a novelist, publishing Roopadarshi, Shantala, Leena, Mrischakitika, Samudyata, Ekalavya, and Sayyada Mane in the Kannada language.

== Works ==
- Iyer, K. V. (1930). Muscle Cult: A Pro-Em to My System. Bangalore: Hercules Gymnasium and Correspondence School of Physical Culture. pp. 41–42. OCLC 37973753.
- Iyer, K. V. (1936). Perfect Physique: a Poem to My System. Bangalore: Bangalore Press. OCLC 39147503.
- Iyer, K. V. (1940). Physique & Figure. Bangalore: Bangalore Press. OCLC 949949106.
- Iyer, K. V. (n.d.). Physical training through correspondence Lessons 1-8. Bangalore: Hercules Gymnasium and Correspondence School of Physical Culture. OCLC 743336221.

== See also ==
- Seetharaman Sundaram - Iyer's assistant and yoga specialist on his lecture/demonstration tours

== Sources ==
- Bharathi, Veena (2015). Ordinary Feet, Extra-Ordinary Feat. Vij Books India. pp. 63–67. ISBN 978-93-84318-78-9.
- Goldberg, Elliott (2016). The Path of Modern Yoga: The History of an Embodied Spiritual Practice. Simon and Schuster. ISBN 978-1-62055-568-2.
- Singleton, Mark (2010). Yoga Body: The Origins of Modern Posture Practice. Oxford University Press. ISBN 978-0-19-539534-1. OCLC 318191988.
