= Nangali =

Nangali Nangli
- town
- Location in Karnataka, India Nangali (India)
- Coordinates: 13°11′N 78°31′E
- Country: India
- State: Karnataka
- District: Kolar
- Taluk: Mulbagal

Population (2001)
  - Total: 5,973

Languages
  - Official: Kannada
- Time zone: UTC+5:30 (IST)

Nangali is a village in the southern state of Karnataka, India. It is in the Mulbagal taluk of Kolar district.

== Demographics ==
As of 2001 India census, Nangali had a population of 5973 with 2982 males and 2991 females. The distance between Nangali and Byrakur is around 5 km

== Notable people ==
K.V. Ramdas (Retd SP CID) Judge Nangali Krishnarao Sudhindrarao, judge Karnataka [High Court] Bangalore. and one of the famous high school called SVVHS in Mallekuppam road .

== See also ==
Historically it was known as the gate way of Hoysala dynasty ( Hoysalara hebbagilu)

- Kolar
- Districts of Karnataka

It is located on the highway of NH75, and border of Karnataka and Andhra Pradesh.
