= Arikunte =

Coordinates: 13°24′N 78°11′E

- Location within Karnataka
- Country: India
- State: Karnataka
- District: Kolar
- Taluk: Srinivasapura

Government
  - Body: Gram Panchayat

Arikunte is a Gram panchayat village in Srinivasapura Taluk, Kolar district in the state of Karnataka, India.
