= Zila Parishad High School =

Indian secondary school

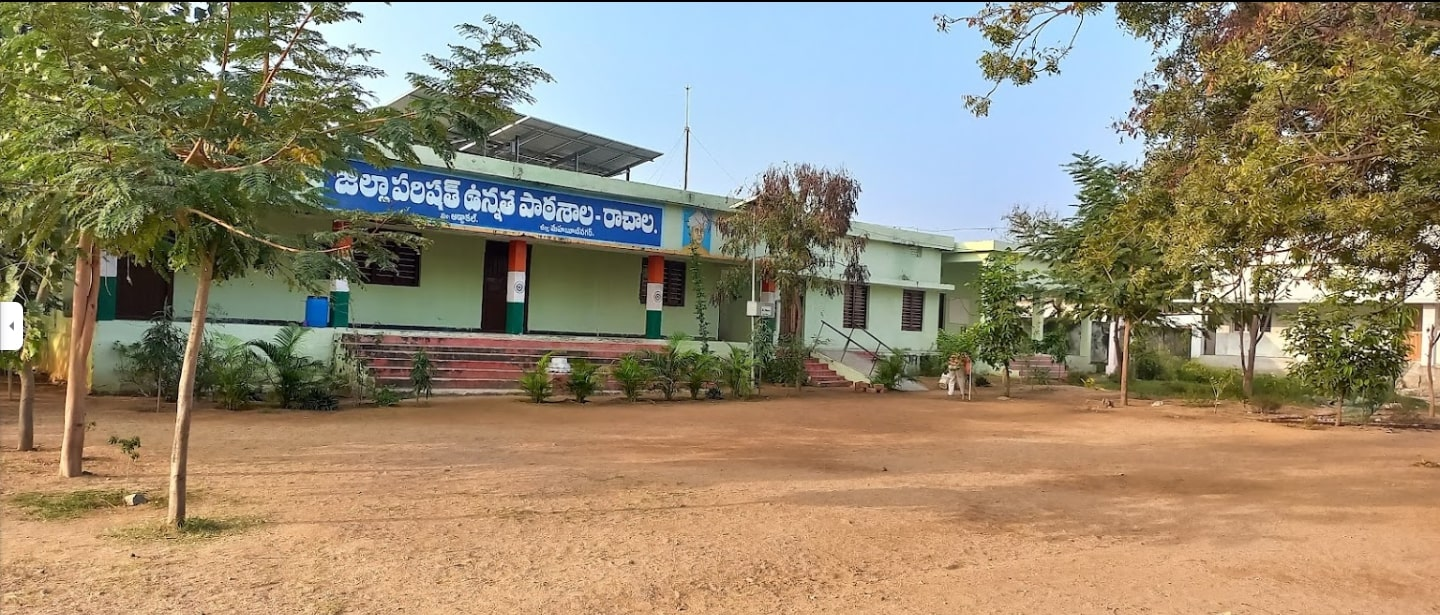
Zila Parishad High School

Zila Parishad High School (ZPHS) is a type of state-run secondary school in India. These schools are established, supervised, and funded by the District Councils of India (locally known as Zila Parishad, district level local authorities of states). ZP High Schools provide education for students from grades 6-10 of the Secondary School Certificate.

== Background ==
Zila Parishad Schools are generally established in rural areas while other government and private high schools cater to urban areas.

== Administration ==
Parishad Educational Officer is responsible for preparing budget for the school and disbursing salaries for Zila Parishad teachers. Director of School Education releases funds for this purpose.

== Zila Parishad High Schools (ZPHS) in Andhra Pradesh ==
| No. | School name | Village/Town | District | State | Established |
|---|---|---|---|---|---|
| 1 | Zila Parishad High School (ZPHS), Pedanandipadu | Pedanandipadu | Guntur | Andhra Pradesh | 1917 |
| 2 | ZPHS, Piduguralla | Piduguralla | Palnadu | Andhra Pradesh | 1942 |
| 3 | ZPHS, Kanchikacherla | Kanchikacherla | Krishna | Andhra Pradesh | 1948 |
| 4 | ZPPHS Boys, Jangareddigudem | Jangareddigudem | Eluru | Andhra Pradesh | 1949 |
| 5 | ZPHS, Chapara | Chapara | Srikakulam | Andhra Pradesh | 1950 |
| 6 | ZPHS, Gollavilli | Gollavilli | East Godavari | Andhra Pradesh | 1951 |
| 7 | ZPHS, Makkuva | Makkuva | Vizianagaram | Andhra Pradesh | 1951 |
| 8 | ZPHS, Vatsavai | Vatsavai | Krishna | Andhra Pradesh | 1951 |
| 9 | ZPHS, Kothavalasa | Kothavalasa | Vizianagaram | Andhra Pradesh | 1952 |
| 10 | ZPHS, Chinnapalli Palem | Chinnapalli Palem | Nellore | Andhra Pradesh | 1952 |
| 11 | ZPHS Girls, Kandukur | Kandukur | Nellore | Andhra Pradesh | 1952 |
| 12 | ZPHS, Singupuram | Singupuram | Srikakulam | Andhra Pradesh | 1955 |
| 13 | ZPHS, Kesanapalli | Kesanapalli | East Godavari | Andhra Pradesh | 1957 |
| 14 | ZPHS, Alamanda Koduru | Alamanda Koduru | Visakhapatnam | Andhra Pradesh | 1958 |
| 15 | ZPHS, Molagavalli | Molagavalli | Kurnool | Andhra Pradesh | 1959 |
| 16 | ZPHS, Koduru | Koduru | Srikakulam | Andhra Pradesh | 1959 |
| 17 | ZPHS, Gonegandla | Gonegandla | Kurnool | Andhra Pradesh | 1960 |
| 18 | ZPHS, Badinehal (Adoni) | Badinehal (Adoni) | Kurnool | Andhra Pradesh | 1960 |
| 19 | ZPHS, Tiruchanur | Tiruchanur | Chittoor | Andhra Pradesh | 1960 |
| 20 | ZPHS, Chembakur | Chembakur | Chittoor | Andhra Pradesh | 1960 |
| 21 | ZPHS, Kadiam | Kadiam | East Godavari | Andhra Pradesh | 1961 |
| 22 | ZPHS, Mulapadu | Mulapadu | Krishna | Andhra Pradesh | 1961 |
| 23 | ZPHS, Gotlagattu | Gotlagattu | Prakasam | Andhra Pradesh | 1961 |
| 24 | ZPHS, B N Kandriga | B N Kandriga | Chittoor | Andhra Pradesh | 1961 |
| 25 | ZPHS, Pathatekkali (Palasa) | Pathatekkali (Palasa) | Srikakulam | Andhra Pradesh | 1961 |
| 26 | ZPHS, Nidamanuru | Nidamanuru | NTR | Andhra Pradesh | 1962 |
| 27 | ZPHS, Pullalacheruvu | Pullalacheruvu | Prakasam | Andhra Pradesh | 1962 |
| 28 | ZPHS, J R Puram | J R Puram | Srikakulam | Andhra Pradesh | 1962 |
| 29 | ZPHS, Venkatagiri | Venkatagiri | Tirupati | Andhra Pradesh | 1963 |
| 30 | ZPHS, Kanithi | Kanithi | Visakhapatnam | Andhra Pradesh | 1965 |
| 31 | ZPHS, Chinnayagudem | Chinnayagudem | West Godavari | Andhra Pradesh | 1966 |
| 32 | ZPHS, Jonnavalasa | Jonnavalasa | Vizianagaram | Andhra Pradesh | 1966 |
| 33 | ZPHS, Iskapalli | Iskapalli | Nellore | Andhra Pradesh | 1967 |
| 34 | ZPHS, Gopalapatnam | Gopalapatnam | Visakhapatnam | Andhra Pradesh | 1968 |
| 35 | ZPHS, Goljam | Goljam | Vizianagaram | Andhra Pradesh | 1968 |
| 36 | ZPHS, Nunna (Vijayawada) | Nunna (Vijayawada) | Krishna | Andhra Pradesh | 1969 |
| 37 | ZPHS, Nagulavaram | Nagulavaram | Guntur | Andhra Pradesh | 1972 |
| 38 | ZPHS, Martur (Ongole) | Martur (Ongole) | Bapatla | Andhra Pradesh | 1975 |
| 39 | ZPHS, Pallam | Pallam | Tirupati | Andhra Pradesh | 1976 |
| 40 | ZPHS, Narava (Gopalapatnam) | Narava (Gopalapatnam) | Visakhapatnam | Andhra Pradesh | 1978 |
| 41 | ZPHS, Pedda Harivanam | Pedda Harivanam | Kurnool | Andhra Pradesh | 1979 |
| 42 | SASR ZPHS, CHV Gudem (Mylavaram) | CHV Gudem (Mylavaram) | Krishna | Andhra Pradesh | 1980 |
| 43 | ZPHS, Nandyalampeta | Nandyalampeta | Kadapa | Andhra Pradesh | 1980 |
| 44 | ZPHS, Ipur | Ipur | Palnadu | Andhra Pradesh | 1980 |
| 45 | ZPHS, Cherukupalli | Cherukupalli | Bapatla | Andhra Pradesh | 1981 |
| 46 | ZPHS, Ilavaram | Ilavaram | Bapatla | Andhra Pradesh | 1981 |
| 47 | ZPHS, Tallapudi | Tallapudi | West Godavari | Andhra Pradesh | 1982 |
| 48 | ZPHS, Sathrawada | Sathrawada | Chittoor | Andhra Pradesh | 1982 |
| 49 | ZPHS, Sanivarapupeta | Sanivarapupeta | Eluru | Andhra Pradesh | 1984 |
| 50 | ZPHS, Savalyapuram | Savalyapuram | Palnadu | Andhra Pradesh | 1984 |

== See also ==
- Mandal Parishad Primary School
- Sarva Shiksha Abhiyan
