= Achampalli (Mulbagal) =

- village
- Nickname: Asamballi
- Interactive map of Achampalli
- Coordinates: 13.0482°N 78.4065°E
- Country: India
- State: Karnataka
- District: Kolar
- Founder: Gopalappa Nadubeedhi
- Named for: Sericulture, vegetables, mangoes and Milk production
- Talukas: Mulbagal

Government
  - Type: Democratic
  - Body: Village Panchayat

Population (2011)
  - Total: appr.800

Languages
  - Official: Kannada
- Time zone: UTC+5:30 (IST)
- Postal code: 563136
- Vehicle registration: KA-07,08
- Civic agency: Village Panchayat

Achampalli (Mulbagal) is a village in the southern state of Karnataka, India. It is located in the Mulbagal taluk of Kolar district in Karnataka.

== See also ==
- Kolar
- Districts of Karnataka
