= Srinivaspur =

Srinivasapura
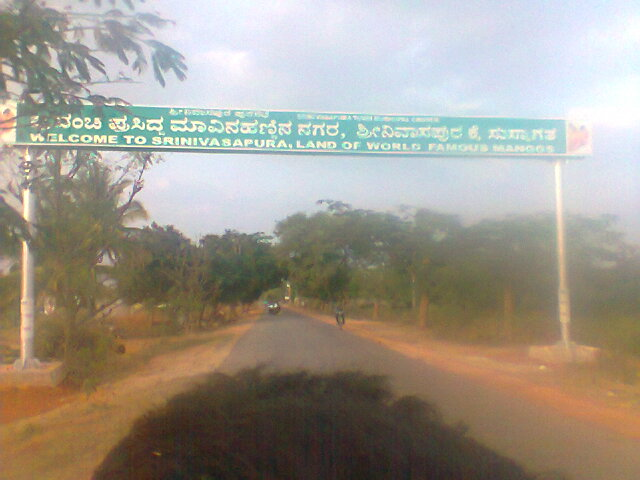
- Welcoming board
- Nickname: land of mangoes
- Location in Karnataka, India
- Coordinates: 13°20′16″N 78°12′44″E
- Country: India
- State: Karnataka
- District: Kolar
- Elevation: 819 m (2,687 ft)

Population (2001)
  - Total: 26,793
- Time zone: UTC+5:30 (IST)
- PIN: 563135
- ISO 3166 code: IN-KA
- Vehicle registration: KA07

Srinivaspur or Srinivasapura is a town located in the Kolar district of Karnataka state, India. The latitude 13.33 and longitude 78.22 are the geocoordinate of the Srinivaspur. Bengaluru is the nearby state capital for Srinivaspur town. It is located around 106 km away from Bengaluru and 80 km from BIAL. The other surrounding state capitals are Chennai 225.9 km., Pondicherry 233.2 km., Hyderabad 453.4 km.,

== Etymology ==
The name Srinivaspur is derived from Shree, a term for the god Vishnu, and place of abode. There is a belief that the town was once visited by Vishnu, who stayed there for some-time. In earlier times, the town was also known as Vanavasapura and, even earlier, when it was a small village, as Papanapalli.

Once diwan Poornaiah who was traveling to Thirupathi, he visited Papanahalli. And asked the name of the town, then he said the above name was not so good, and it is also near to Tirupathi so he called the Papanapalli as "Srinivaspur" Srinivasa is the name of Lord Balaji of Thirupathi and pura is town.

== Geography and climate ==
Srinivaspur is located at 13.33°N 78.22°E. It has an average elevation of 819 metres (2,687 ft). The geographical area of the taluk is 860 square kilometres (330 sq mi).

Srinivaspur is one of the five taluks of Kolar district. The taluk is bound by Kolar and Mulbagal taluks of Kolar district, the Chintamani taluk of Chikkaballapura district, and Chittoor district in Andhra Pradesh.

The nearest towns are Chintamani, Mulbagal, Kurudumale, Kolar, Gownipally, Madanapalli, Punganur, and the Andhra Pradesh towns of Chembakur and B.Kottakota. It is 90 kilometres (56 mi) from Bangalore.

There are no perennial rivers in the taluk but Kushavati stream, which is a tributary to the Papaghni river, runs through it. There is gravelly soil in the area, which is suitable for growing groundnut, ragi and pulses. Tomato is also grown as a commercial crop.

The climate is dry and hot during summer. Average rainfall is 722 millimetres (28.4 in), which is slightly below the district average. On average, the taluk receives rain on 55 days per annum.

== Politics ==
The taluk has 296 villages and is subdivided into five hoblis, being Srinivasapur(Kasaba), Ronur, Nelavanki, Rayalapadu and Yeldur. Administration of the taluk is the responsibility of the [taluk panchayat], which in turn reports to the [zilla panchayat].

Srinivaspur assembly seat is part of Kolar Lok Sabha seat. Ramesh Kumar and G K Venkatashiva Reddy both has been a steady factor in the politics here, as they represented this seat for various parties over the years.

== Demographics ==
The 2001 census of India recorded that Srinivasapur had a population of 22,926, of which males comprised 51 per cent. The average literacy rate was 64%, higher than the national average of 59.5 per cent: male literacy was 68 per cent and female literacy 58 per cent. 15 per cent of the population was under six years of age.

== Economy ==
Horticulture is the major commercial, manual laboured, occupation oriented towards cultivation of mangoes and is the only place in the world where all 63 species of mango is found. The taluk is sometimes referred to as Mango City and is the biggest producer of mangoes in Karnataka

Milk and silk production are also significant products.
