= Kurudumale =

Kudumale Kurudumale
- village
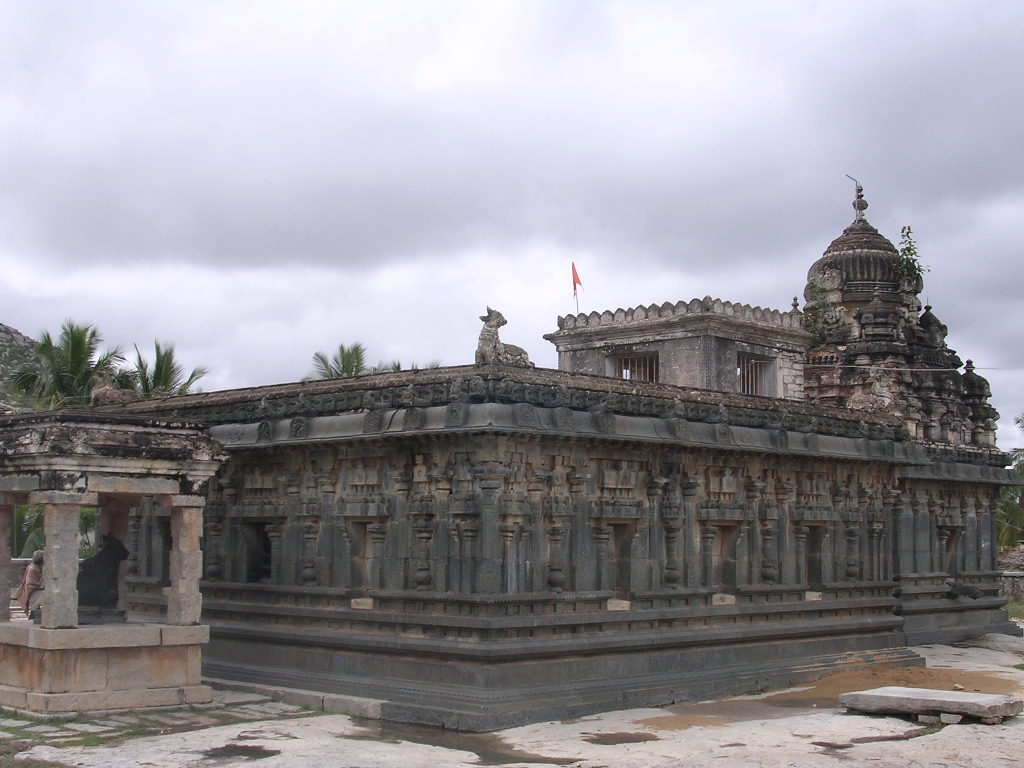
- Someshvara temple at Kurudumale

- Location within Karnataka Location within India
- Coordinates: 13.12°N 78.22°E
- Country: India
- State: Karnataka
- District: Kolar

Languages
  - Official: Kannada
- Time zone: UTC+5:30 (IST)
- Nearest city: Bangalore

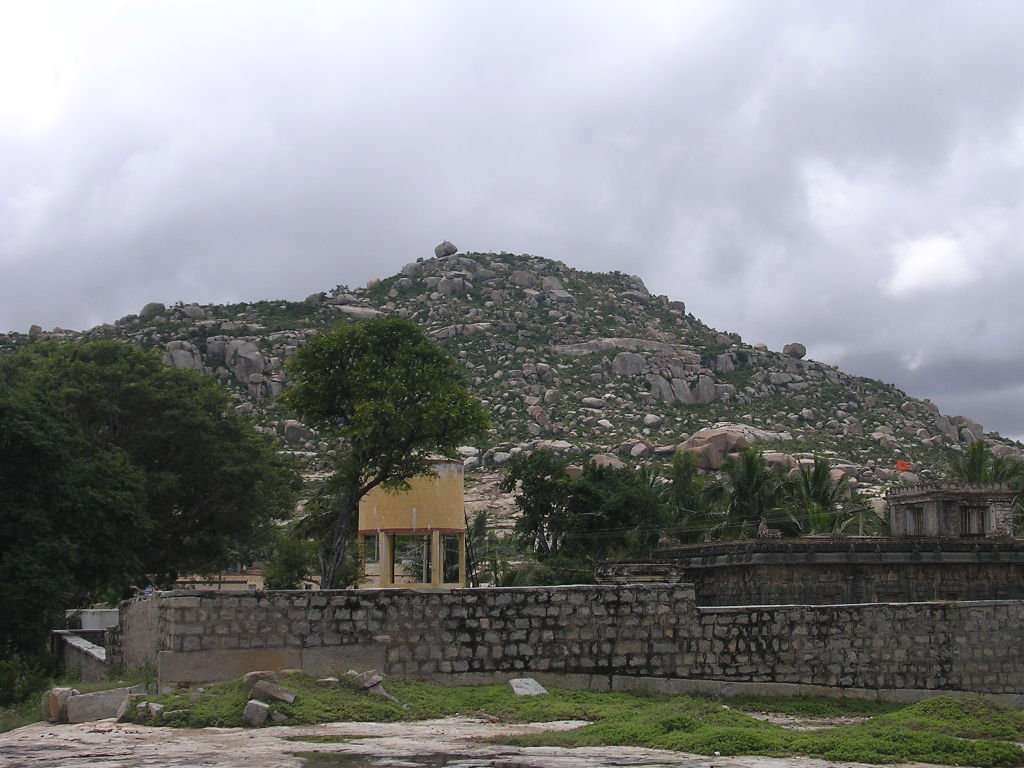
Another View of Kurudumale

Kurudumale is a village in the taluk of Mulbagal, Kolar district, Karnataka, India. It is located about 10 km from the mulubagal town, northerly. The giant, thirteen and a half foot sculpture of kurudumale Ganesha and the Someshwara temple of lord Shiva attract thousands of visitors from the surrounding states. This place was believed to be the place where Devas would descend from the heavens for recreation on earth.

There is another temple dedicated to Shiva called the Someshwara temple which is also situated in Kurudumale. The interesting thing about this temple is that it is built of a rock without any foundations. Another interesting thing is the architectural style of the temple; this temple is considered to be older than the Ganesha temple and was built during the Cholas period. Half of the temple has different style of carving, believed to have been done by artist Jakanachari and the other half is believed to have been carved by his son Dankanachari. The part of the temple supposedly built by Dankana's has statues and carvings which are more intricate and sophisticated.

== Gallery ==
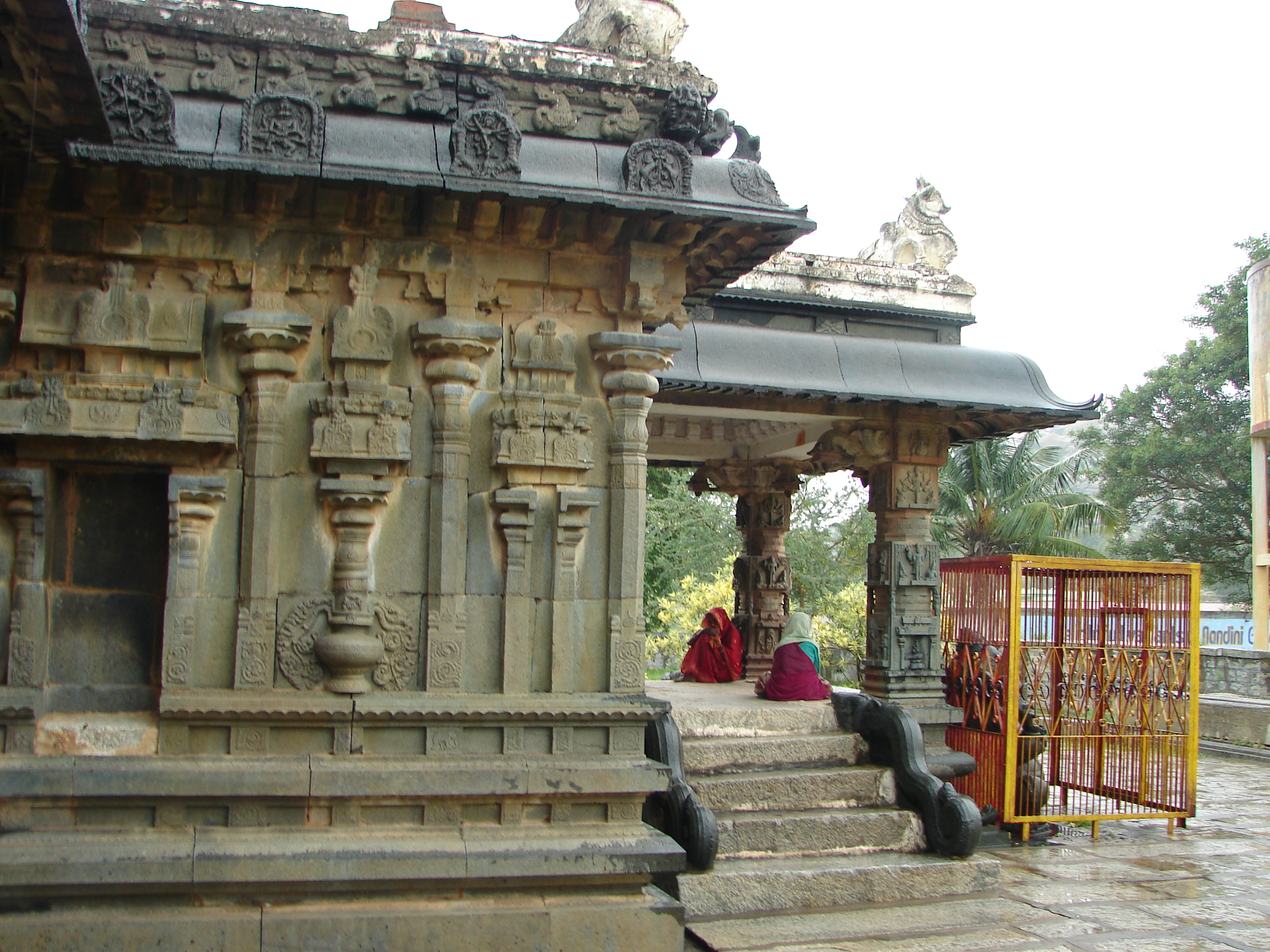
A profile of the Someshvara temple

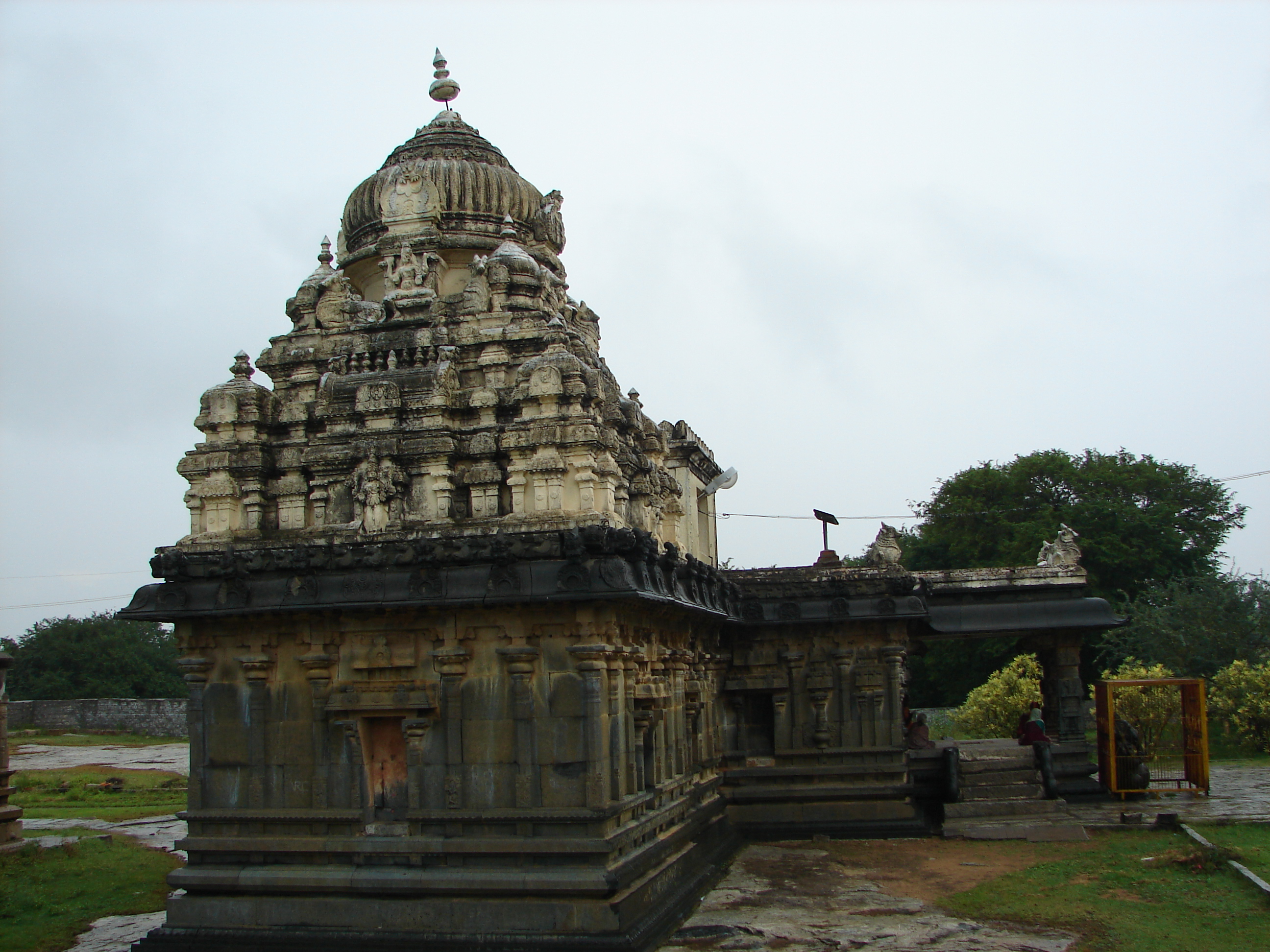
Rear view of the Someshvara temple
