= Byrakur =

Byrakuru Bairakuru, Byrakur
- village
- Nickname: Free State
- Location in Karnataka, India Byrakuru (India)
- Coordinates: 13°14′20″N 78°29′34″E
- Country: India
- State: Karnataka
- District: Kolar
- Talukas: Mulbagal Taluk

Government
  - Type: Panchayat raj
  - Body: Gram panchayat

Area
  - Total: 345.6 km^{2} (133.4 sq mi)

Population (2011)
  - Total: 2,361
  - Density: 6.832/km^{2} (17.69/sq mi)

Languages
  - Official: Kannada
- Time zone: UTC+5:30 (IST)
- PIN: 563131
- Telephone code: 08159
- ISO 3166 code: IN-KA
- Vehicle registration: KA-07
- Nearest city: Kolar
- Lok Sabha constituency: Kolar
- Vidhan Sabha constituency: Mulbagal
- Climate: Byrakur Weather (Köppen)
- Website: karnataka.gov.in

Byrakur is a town in Mulbagal Taluk, Kolar District in the Indian state of Karnataka. Byrakur serves as the administrative headquarter for 16 villages in Mulbagal Taluk. It is located 110 km from Bangalore, and 16 km from Punganur, Andhra Pradesh. The village is home to the Maryamma Temple.

== Education ==
Sri Manjunatha Vidhya Samasthe (SMVS) is a registered organisation established in 1987 to provide primary education to children in rural areas. It runs two educational establishments in Byrakur.

- Sri Manjunatha Higher Primary School, Byrakur (Aided by the Government of Karnataka)
- Sri Manjunatha Nursery School, Byrakur (Affiliated with the Government of Karnataka)

The Sri Manjunatha Higher Primary School was established in 1987 and offers kindergarten to primary education (7th Standard). The Government of Maharashtra has identified the school's achievements and offers grants for 1st to 7th standard grades (Kannada Medium).

== Villages ==
Perumkanahlli is a village located 1 km south of Byrakur and home to about 200 people. Pethandalahalli is also a small village in Mulbagal Taluk. The village falls under Byrakur Panchayat and belongs to the Bangalore Division. The village is located 32 km east of its district headquarters, Kolar, and is 103 km from the state capital, Bangalore.
