= Our Lady of Victories Church, Kolar district, Karnataka =

Catholic church building in India

Coordinates: 12.9355°N 78.2618°E

Our Lady of Victories Church is a Catholic church situated in the Kolar Gold Fields within the Kolar district, in the State of Karnataka in India. This was the first parish church that was established in the Kolar District (1884–1932) and heads the other parishes under its Diocese. Originally, the church consisted of 16,000 Catholics, which included 9,000 Tamil followers and 1,000 British and Italian followers. There were also 5,000 parishioners that belonged to other parishes in the congregation.

== History ==
Our Lady of Victories Church was built by Rev. Fr Fray See, who served as the parish priest of this church for 18 years between 1889 and 1907. He also constructed the Nun's House in 1921 within the Church premises.

In 1888, Rev. Fr. Quenard Vershure and Fr. Coree met and baptized many adherents. Rev. Fr. Coree even had baptized around 2,500 people within a month. The European Nun's House was managed by three superior nuns along with Rev. Beutrice, the mother of the house. The nuns provided a good education to parishioners and assisted the parish priest in conducting spiritual meetings and mass offerings. They used to visit all the parishioners in the Kolar Goldfield Area, supporting the local community by means of social services.

One of the priests of this Church also built a Shrine called the St. Barbara in the north-east corner of the church compound at Champion Reefs. St. Barbara is the patron saint of miners. Every Thursday, the church organized prayer and benediction in the shrine for all devotees. A Senior member of the Church, Mr. P.A Anthony Pillai, established a Book Depot in the backyard of the church that sold religious articles imported From Europe, including statues, pictures, and rosaries. He also ran a Tamil library that sold Indian medicines. He would feed the poor every Friday during Lent. However, a catastrophe occurred in the early hours of January 23, 1952. A rock burst out from the ground at approximately 6:30 AM. This happened while the parish priest was performing his offerings of the Holy Mass in the Church. This incident shook the entire building and shattered the church. The result was the collapse of the beams and walls. Other buildings in this area, such as the Magistrate's court, post office, central jail, staff workers' quarters, schools, the Italian club, hospital, railway station and several other structures were also destroyed beyond repair. Fortunately, there were no casualties and a new church was constructed in 1953, which was established under the Bangalore Diocese.

The statue of Our Lady of Victories, measuring about 6 ft (1.8 m) tall and located on a pedestal about 15 ft (4.6 m) from the church floor, was the only statue left untouched by this catastrophic incident. The Statue stands formidably in the newly constructed church just over the main altar. The statue, originally imported from Portugal, is described as possessing a face that is filled with compassion and many who seek help are seen to kneel before the Our Lady Of Victories shrine and pray for blessings and spiritual attainment.

== Geographical significance ==
The gold mine located in the district existed even prior to the arrival of the British as mentioned by Roman historian Pliny who had once passed through this region in 77 A.D. In 1850, Pliny made mention of the extensive gold and silver mines that spread over an expansive area. An Irish soldier named Lavelle, who was recuperating in Bangalore after fighting the Māori, was in New Zealand when he heard about the native mines of Kolar and decided to investigate. Today, the Bangalore Cantonment - a road that leads to the Survey of India Office - is named after him.

There are five main mines in this district, known as the Mysore, Oorgaum, NandiDurg, and Balghat mines. Out of the total population in the mining areas, there are about 10 to 15 thousand Roman Catholics, a few Protestants and a minority section of Buddhists. Most of the Anglo-Indians and British citizens who settled in this mining area are Catholics. Since there were a number of Catholics in the K.G.F. area, two Churches were built between 1900 and 1912. One Of these churches was Our Lady Of Victories Church; the other being St. Anthony's Church in the Balghat Mining Area. St. Mary's Boys Primary and Middle School are also situated in the Champion Reefs church area.
