= Kolar Theppothsava =

Theppotsava is a floating festival organised each year when lake Kolarammana Kere overflows. Lake Kolarammana Kere is in the heart of the Kolar district, near the Kolaramma Temple. Theppotsava is also celebrated in almost all the towns and villages of Karnataka with a standing body of water. It is a major festival in many villages and towns because it indicates good rains and harvest season. It's a way of expressing gratitude to the rain gods and in general to the lake for holding the water which is very precious in water-scarce regions.

== Festival ==
The festival involves the whole community, and usually is celebrated over many days of festivities and fairs. The Kolar Theppotsava begins with offering puja to the presiding deity of the town, Kolaramma. Then a float is made on which the statue of the goddess is placed. The women of the town of Kolar and Kurubarapet make their own little floats with a lamp on it and take it to the lake. After offering puja to the lake, the floats are dispersed in the water at night.

== See also ==
- Theppotsavam
