= Theppotsavam =

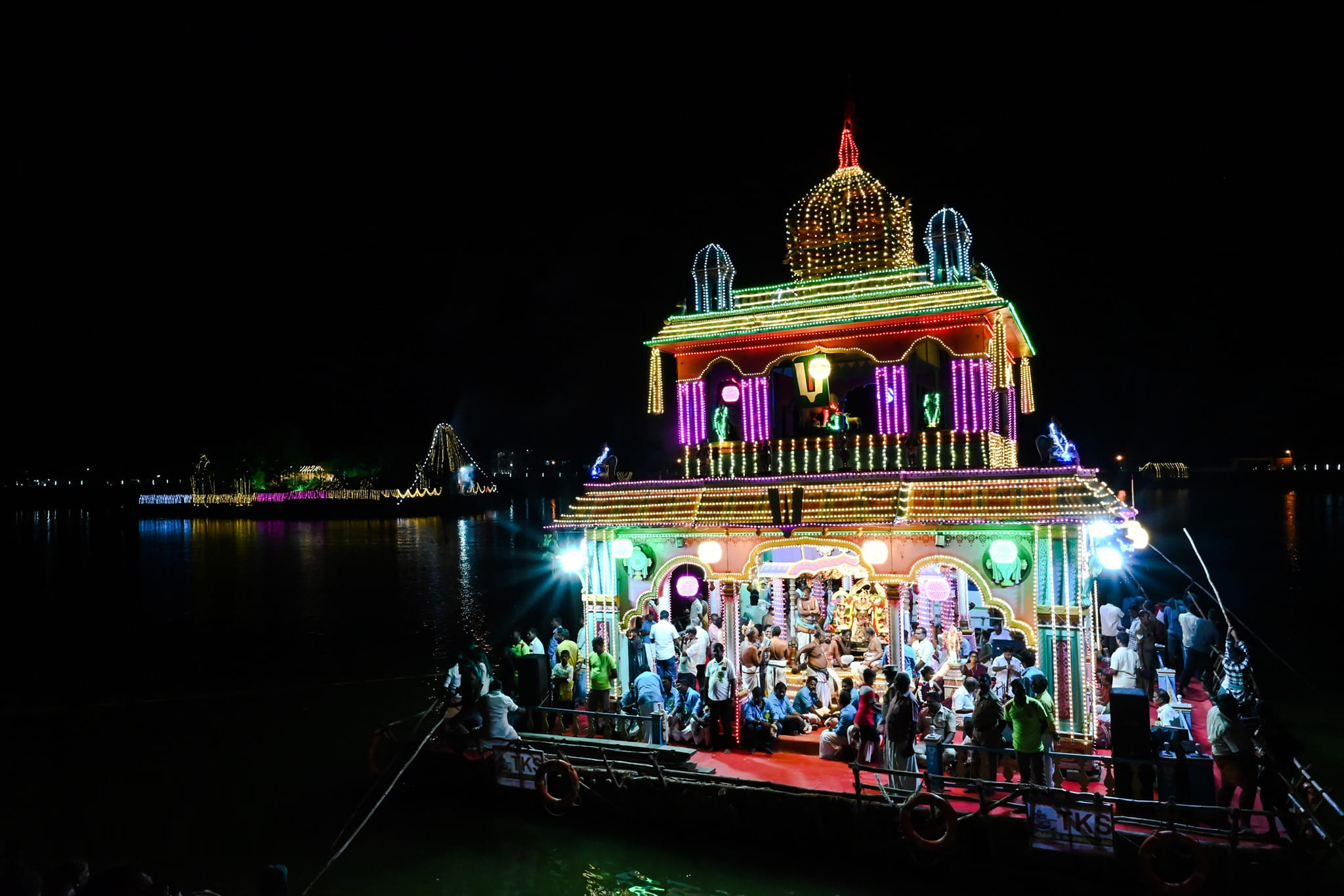

Theppotsavam, or Teppotsavam or Float Festival, is a religious festival carried out in Hindu temples in parts of South India, mainly Tamil Nadu and Andhra Pradesh during the month of Chitthirai or Aries. As a part of this festival, the principal idol of the temples is decorated and taken in procession through the tank of the temple.

Some of the temples where the float festival is celebrated are:

- Tirumala Venkateswara Temple
- Meenakshi Amman Temple, Madurai
- Samayapuram Mariamman Temple
- Rajagopalaswamy Temple, Mannargudi
- Thiyagarajar Temple, Thiruvarur
- Simhachalam Temple, Visakhapatnam
- Kanaka Durga Temple, Vijayawada
- Kolaramma Temple, Kolar, Karnataka
- Kapaleeshwarar Temple, Chennai, Tamil Nadu

== Tirumala Venkateswara Temple ==
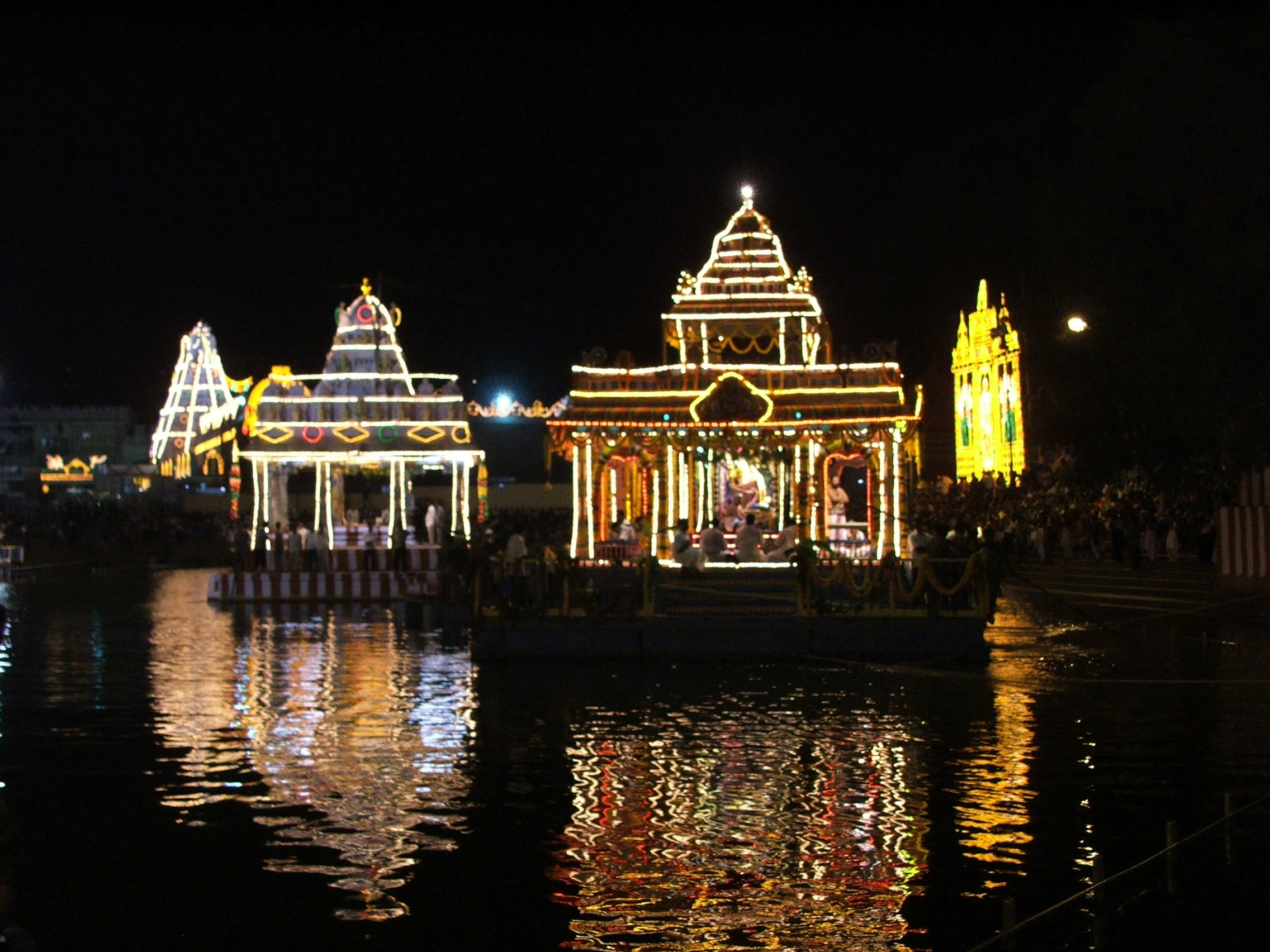
Swami Pushkarini, Tirumala

The float festival at Tirumala Venkateswara Temple is observed over five days in the sacred Swami Pushkarini during the Chaitra month (March), coinciding with Phalguna Pournami. The festivities begin with a divine procession of Lord Rama, accompanied by Sita and Lakshmana, taken on a ceremonially adorned float. On the second day, Lord Sri Krishna and Rukmini are worshipped and taken for a pleasure ride across the temple tank.

The final three days—Trayodashi to Pournami—feature Sri Malayappa Swami with Sridevi and Bhudevi, taken on an elaborately decorated float. The number of rounds increases each day: three on the third day, five on the fourth, and seven on the final day. The concluding day draws massive crowds, as the brilliance of the full moon adds to the grandeur of the procession. Devotees holding Arjita Seva tickets are granted darshan of the deities after the float ritual.

== Meenakshi Amman Temple, Madurai ==
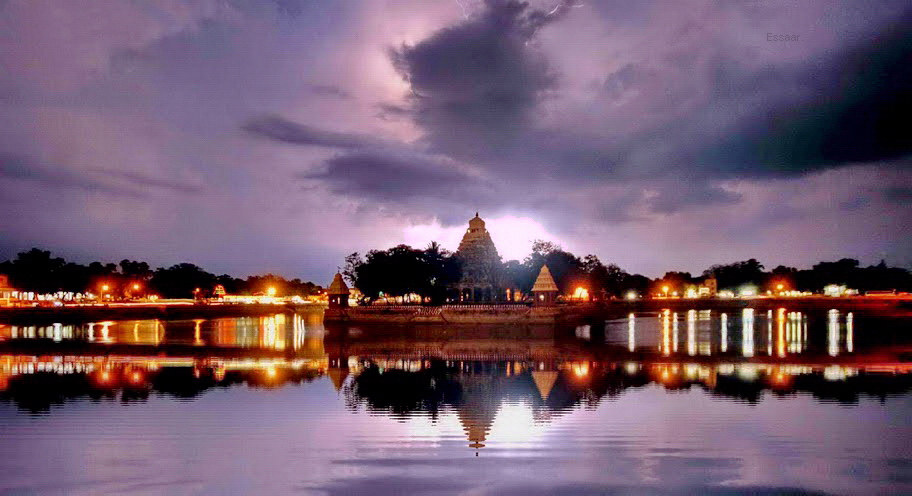
Vandiyur Mariamman Teppakulam

The Theppa Thiruvizha (Float Festival) at the Meenakshi Amman Temple is one of the most iconic festivals of Madurai, celebrated annually during the Tamil month of Thai (January–February), typically on the day of Thai Poosam. The festival takes place at the historic Vandiyur Mariamman Teppakulam, the largest temple tank in Tamil Nadu, built by King Thirumalai Nayak in 1646 CE. This massive tank spans 16 acres, with 12 long stone steps on each side and a central mandapam housing a Vinayaka shrine known as Mukkuruni Pillaiyar.

During the festival, the utsava murtis of Goddess Meenakshi and Lord Sundareswarar are brought in a procession from the temple to the tank on golden palanquins, accompanied by temple elephants and musical troupes. The deities are taken on an adorned float and circled around the tank multiple times during the evening. The tank is illuminated with thousands of lamps and decorated with flowers. The float festival commemorates the marriage of Meenakshi and Sundareswarar, and draws lakhs of devotees from across the region.

== Samayapuram Mariamman Temple ==
The festival concludes with the Theppam (Float) Festival, celebrated in the temple tank during the final week of April, following the Chithirai Ther Thiruvizha. This sacred event marks a serene yet spiritually uplifting finale to the grand festivities. On this day, the utsava murti of Arulmigu Samayapuram Mariamman is ceremoniously placed on an intricately adorned float (theppam) and taken on a divine procession across the temple tank. The float, decorated with flowers, lamps, and colorful fabrics, is gently pulled around the tank by ropes, while devotees chant hymns and offer prayers from the banks.

== Rajagopalaswamy Temple, Mannargudi ==
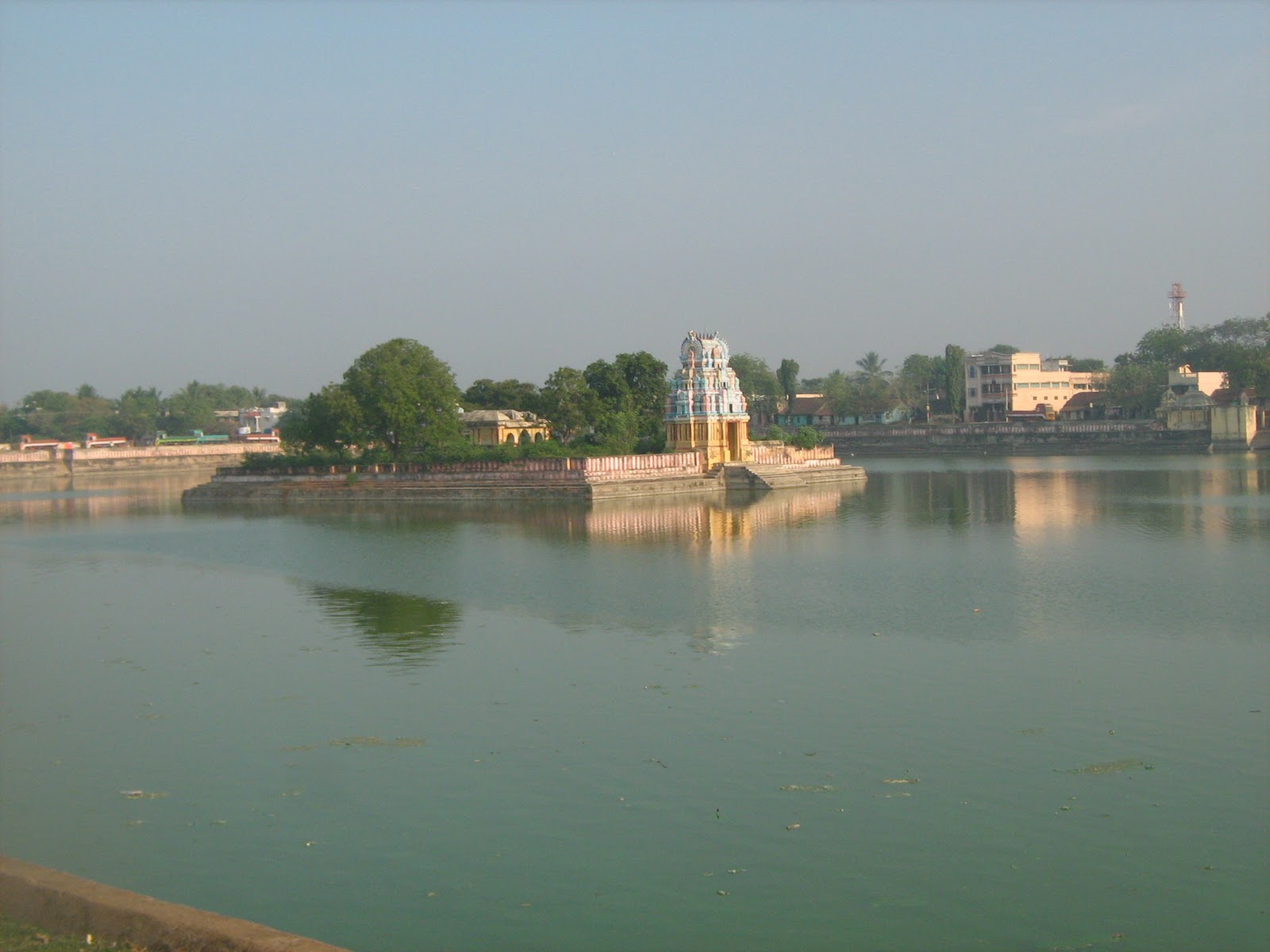
Haridra Nadhi, Mannargudi

The Sri Vidhya Rajagopalaswamy Temple in Mannargudi, Tamil Nadu, is a prominent Vaishnava shrine dedicated to Lord Rajagopalaswamy, a divine form of Krishna. Revered as the foremost among the 108 Abhimana Kshethrams, it is popularly known as Dakshina Dwaraka (Southern Dvaraka) and stands as one of the most significant Vaishnavite temples in India. The temple is especially renowned for its grand Aani Theppotsavam and Panguni Vidayatri Utsavam, both marked by elaborate float festivals and vibrant vahana processions. During the Aani month, the ten-day Theppotsavam includes morning and evening Vahana Seva, where Sri Perumal is taken in procession on various mounts such as Surya Prabha, Sesha, Garuda, Hanumantha, and Yaanai (Elephant) vahanams. The processions begin from the Theppotsavam Mandapam, which is located on the southern side of the Haridra Nadhi. Highlights of the festival include the Garuda Sevai and the charming Vennaithazhi Utsavam, in which the deity appears in Navaneetha Sevai Thirukolam, holding a butter pot.

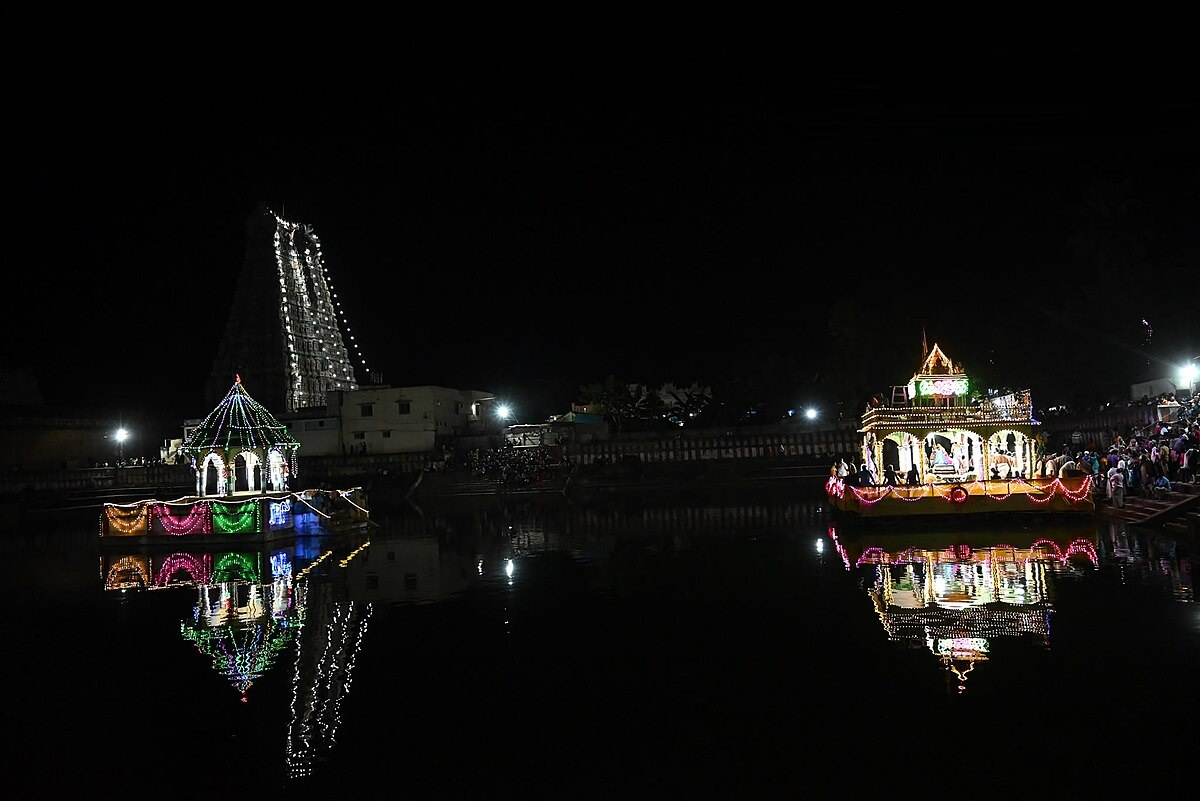
Krishna Theertham, Mannargudi

The most anticipated event is the Haridra Nadhi Theppotsavam , held on Aani Month Pournami, the ninth day of the festival. The float procession takes place in the vast Haridra Nadhi Tank, one of Asia’s largest temple tanks. Sri Perumal, along with Rukmini and Satyabhama, graces the float for three ceremonial rounds, creating a mesmerizing scene under the full moon. Another major float event is the Krishna Theertham Theppam, conducted on the twelfth day of the Panguni Vidayatri Utsavam, marking the conclusion of the Brahmotsavam. The deity appears in Kalyana Thirukolam, adorned with a Rathinam-studded crown, and is taken on three rounds in the sacred tank, blessing devotees gathered for the occasion.

== Thyagarajar Temple, Thiruvarur ==
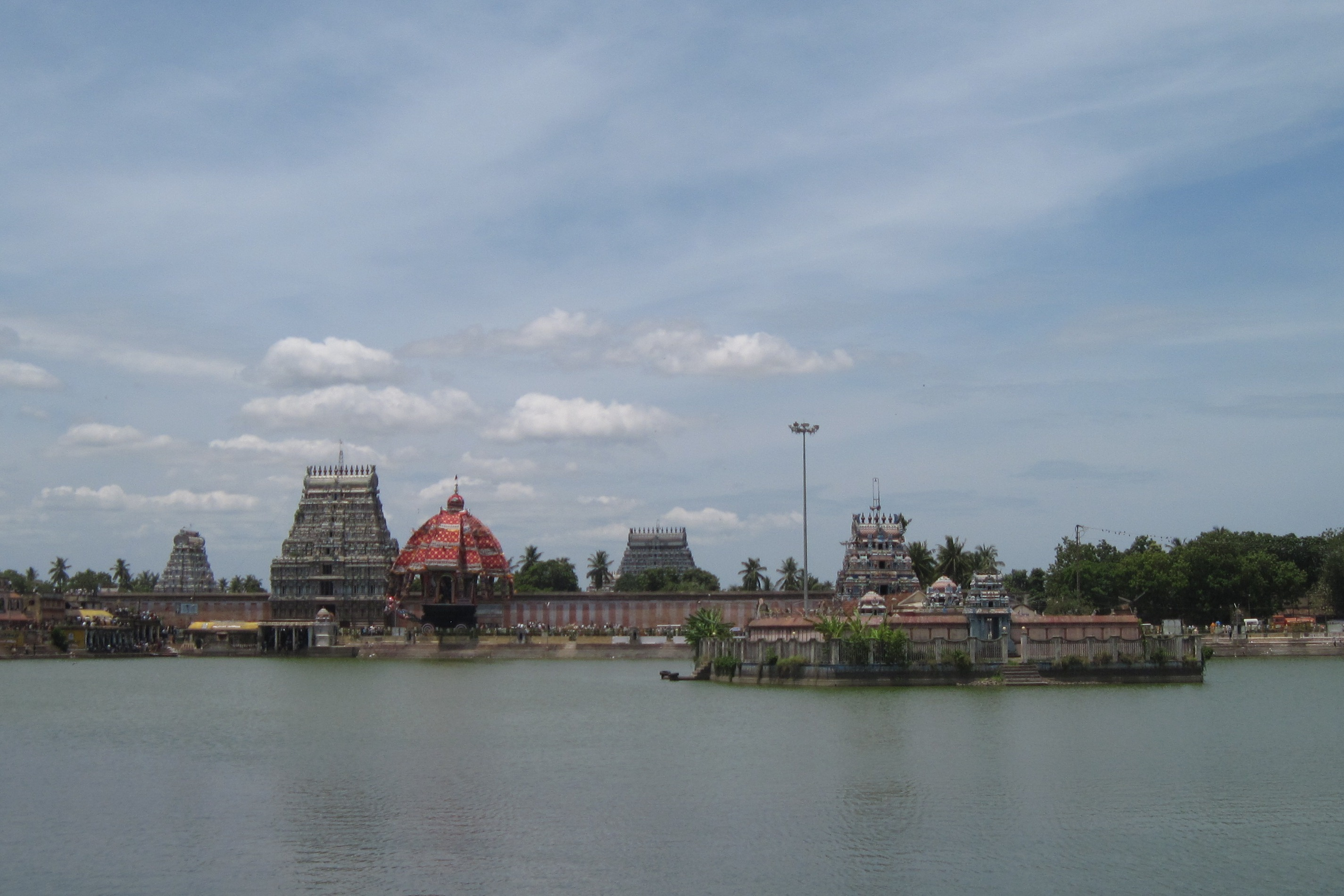
Kamalalayam, Tiruvarur

The Thyagarajaswamy Temple in Thiruvarur, Tamil Nadu, is famed for its majestic Chariot Festival, held annually in the Tamil month of Chitrai (April–May), followed by the spiritually significant Theppam (Float Festival) celebrated in the temple’s sacred tank, Kamalalayam. The Theppathiruvizha spans three days and features the divine float crafted in the shape of the Thyagarajaswamy Temple. The float is adorned with vibrant decorations and carries images of deities including Thyagaraja, Kamalambal, Neelotpalaambal, Vinayaka, and Murugan. The central focus of the float festival is Kalyanasundara Murthy, a divine form of Lord Shiva symbolizing his celestial wedding with Goddess Parvati.

Following the Aazhi Therottam (chariot procession), the deity's float is taken to Kamalalayam's tank as part of the temple's festival celebrations. During the Float Festival, the float is drawn across the tank amid devotional ceremonies. The temple chariot is reported to be approximately 90 feet tall and to weigh more than 300 tonnes.

== Kapaleeshwarar Temple, Chennai ==
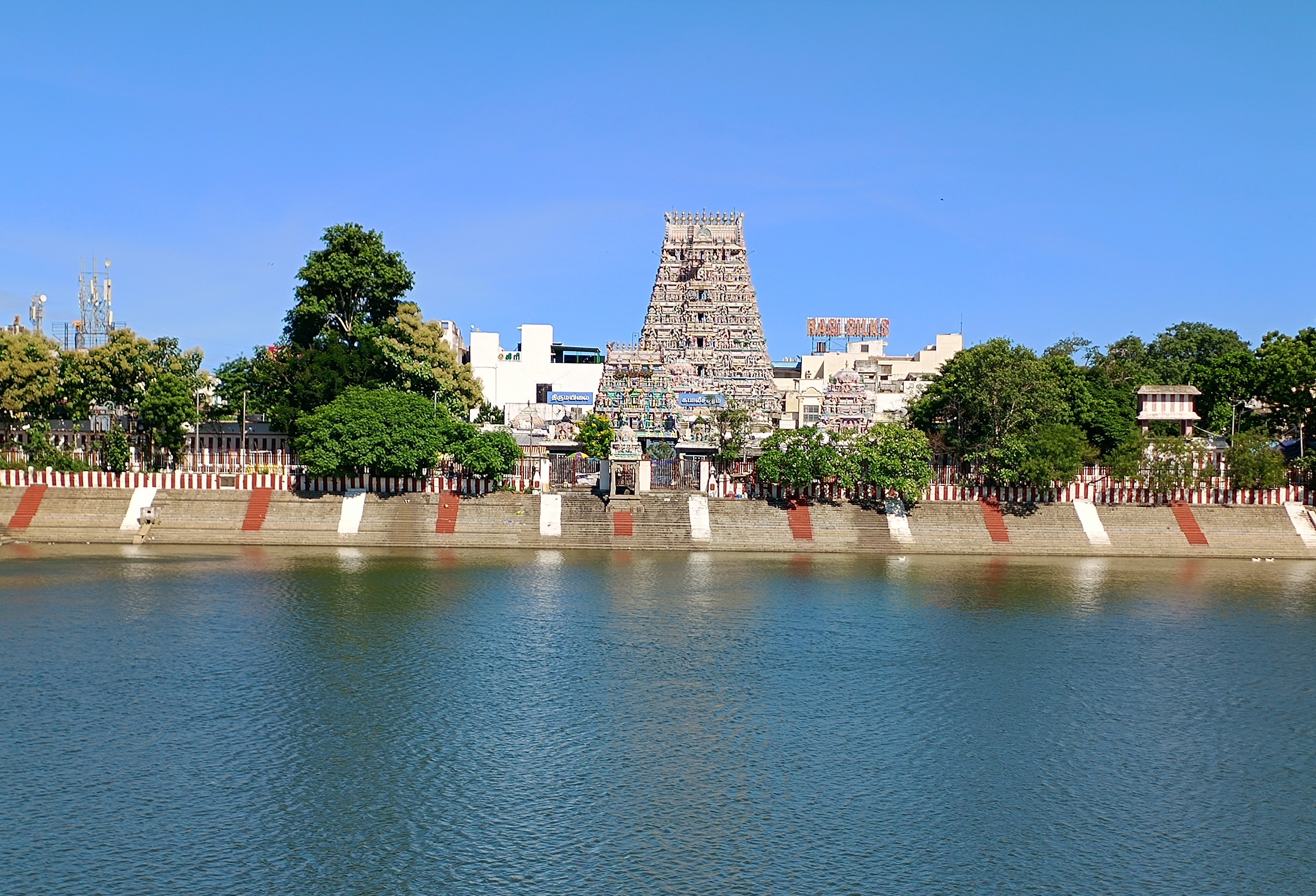
Kapaleswarar Temple Tank

The Kapaleeshwarar Temple, located in Mylapore, Chennai, is one of the most iconic Shaivite temples in Tamil Nadu. Dedicated to Lord Shiva as Kapaleeshwarar and Goddess Parvati as Karpagambal, the temple is celebrated for its grand annual Theppa Thiruvizha (Float Festival). The Theppam Festival is held in the Tamil month of Thai (January–February). During this event, the utsava murthis (festival deities) of Kapaleeshwarar and Karpagambal are taken on a beautifully decorated float (theppam) in the temple tank, known as the Kapaleeshwarar Tank or Mylapore Tank, located to the west of the main shrine. The tank is illuminated with vibrant lights and adorned with festoons, creating a festive atmosphere that attracts thousands of devotees.

The festival begins with vahana processions, where the deities are carried on various divine mounts such as the Nandi, elephant, and peacock, symbolizing different divine aspects. Following the vahana seva, the deities are mounted on the theppam and taken on pradakshinam (circumambulation) around the tank in a ceremonial float procession.

== See also ==
- Kolar Theppothsava
