= Someshwara Temple, Kolar =

14th-century Hindu temple in India

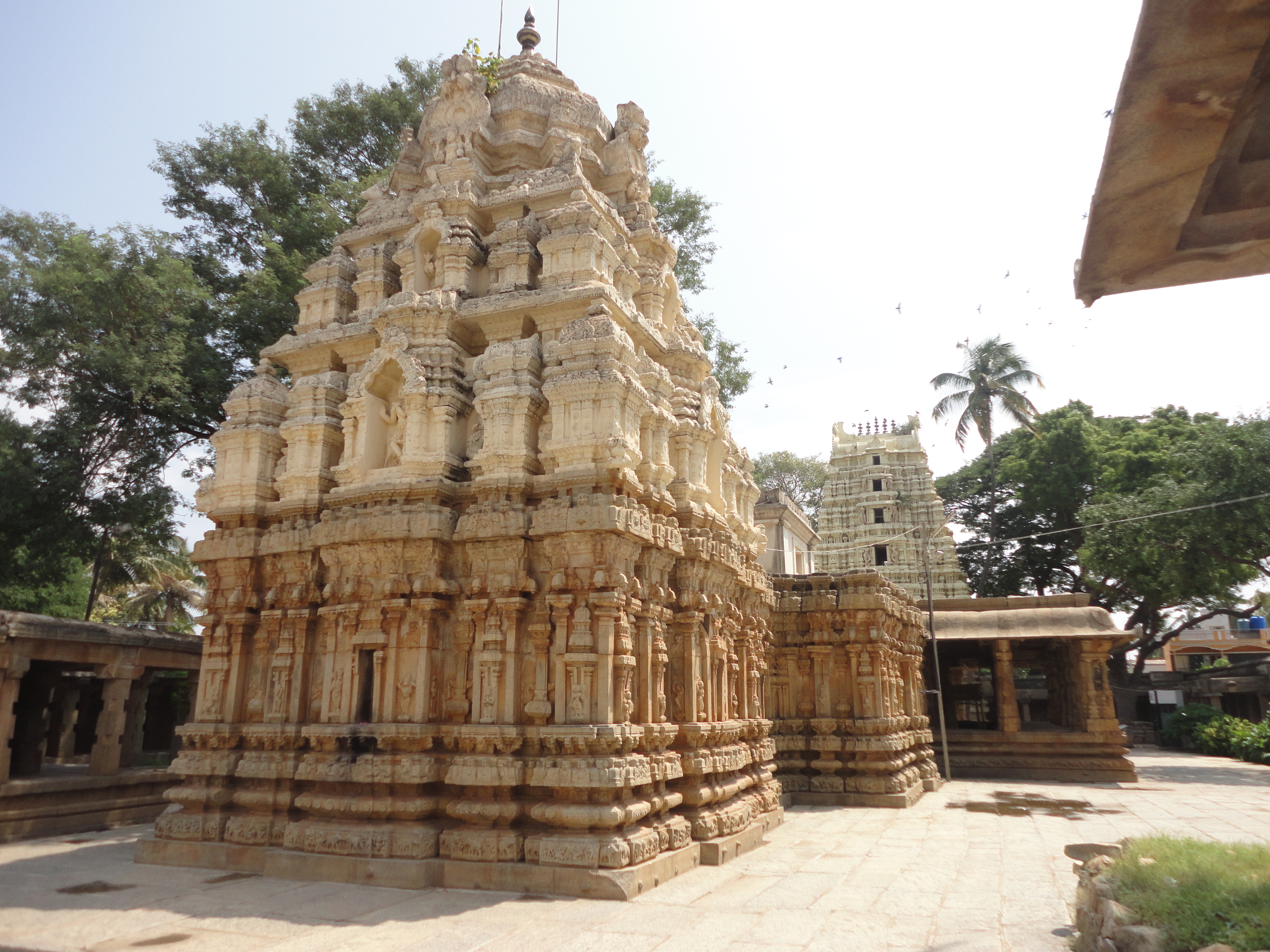
A view from rear of the Someshwara temple at Kolar

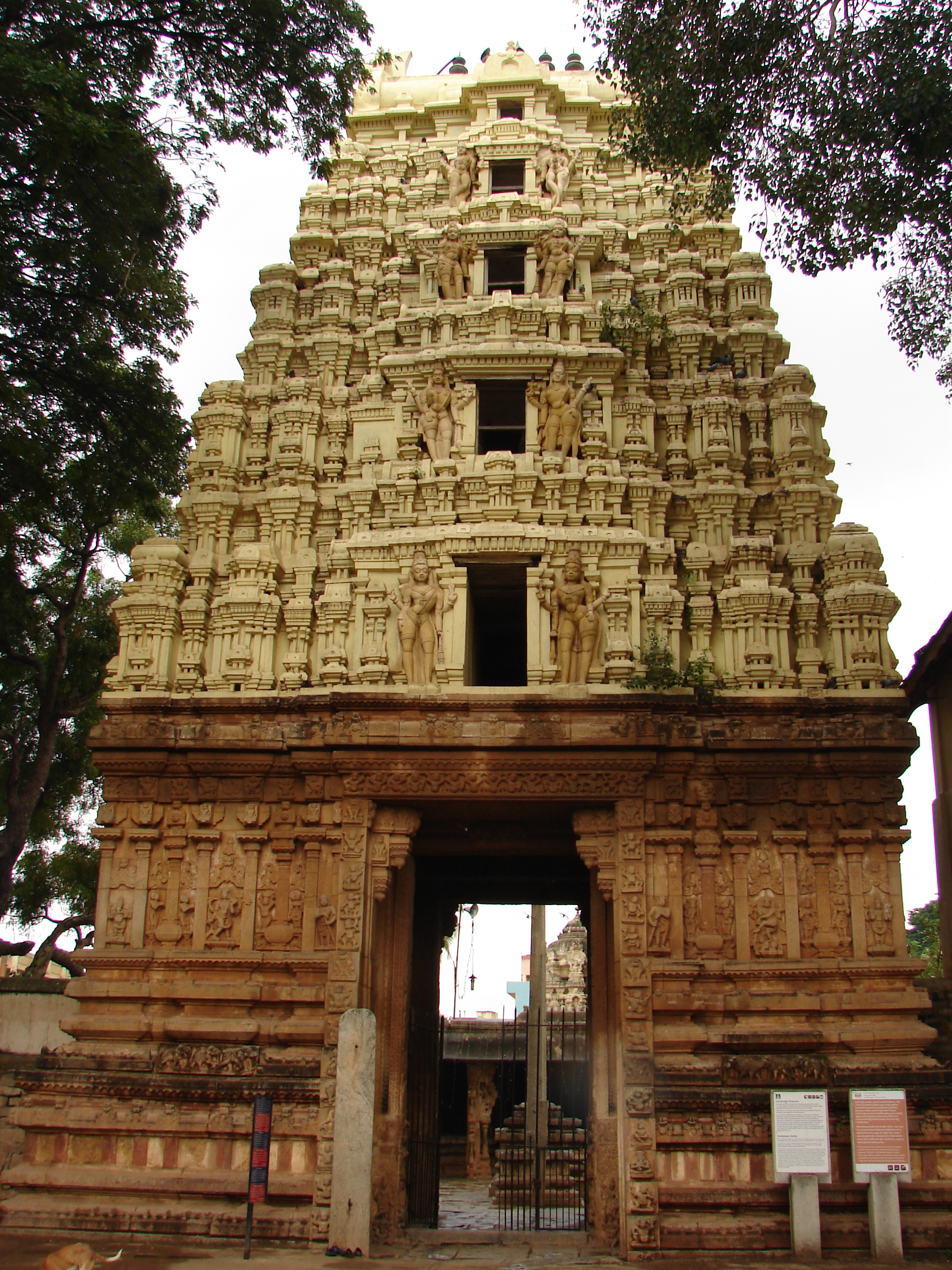
The main gopura (tower over the entrance) of Someshwara temple at Kolar

The Someshwara temple (also spelt Someshvara or Somesvara), situated in the town of Kolar, Karnataka, India is an ornate 14th century Vijayanagara era Dravidian style construction. Someshwara, another name for the Hindu god Shiva is the presiding deity in the temple. The temple is protected by the Archaeological Survey of India as a monument of national importance.

== Temple plan ==
According to art historian George Michel, the general plan of the temple resembles that of the Someshvara temple in Bangalore, except, this temple is more rich in finish and detail. The temple is noted for its tall superstructure (gopuram) over the main entrance (mahadwara). The superstructure is built of brick and stucco. Though both temples have a large open pillared mukhamantapa (hall) leading to the sanctum (garbhagriha), in Kolar the open mantapa has a central hall surrounded by a raised floor. Several ornate pillars on the raised floor support the ceiling of the mantapa. The main shrine has a dravida (south Indian) style tower (shikhara), a vestibule (sukanasi) that connects the sanctum to a navaranga (closed hall) which leads to the large pillared mukhamandapa. The temple is enclosed by a cloistered wall (prakara). At the frontal extension of the hall are four full length pillars depicting riders on Yalis ("mythical beasts"). An ornate Kalyana mantapa ("marriage hall") built of granite, at the south-west corner of the complex, has pillars with decorative sculptures in relief. Michell dates the temple to about the 17th century, but the Archaeological Survey of India dates the temple to the early Vijayanagara Empire rule of the 14th century. The base of the temple outer wall (adhishthana) consists of decorative moldings, with friezes of elephants, dwarfs and lions embellishing the upper moldings . The outer wall of the temple has miniature decorative pilasters (kumbha) with turrets (aedicule).

== Gallery ==
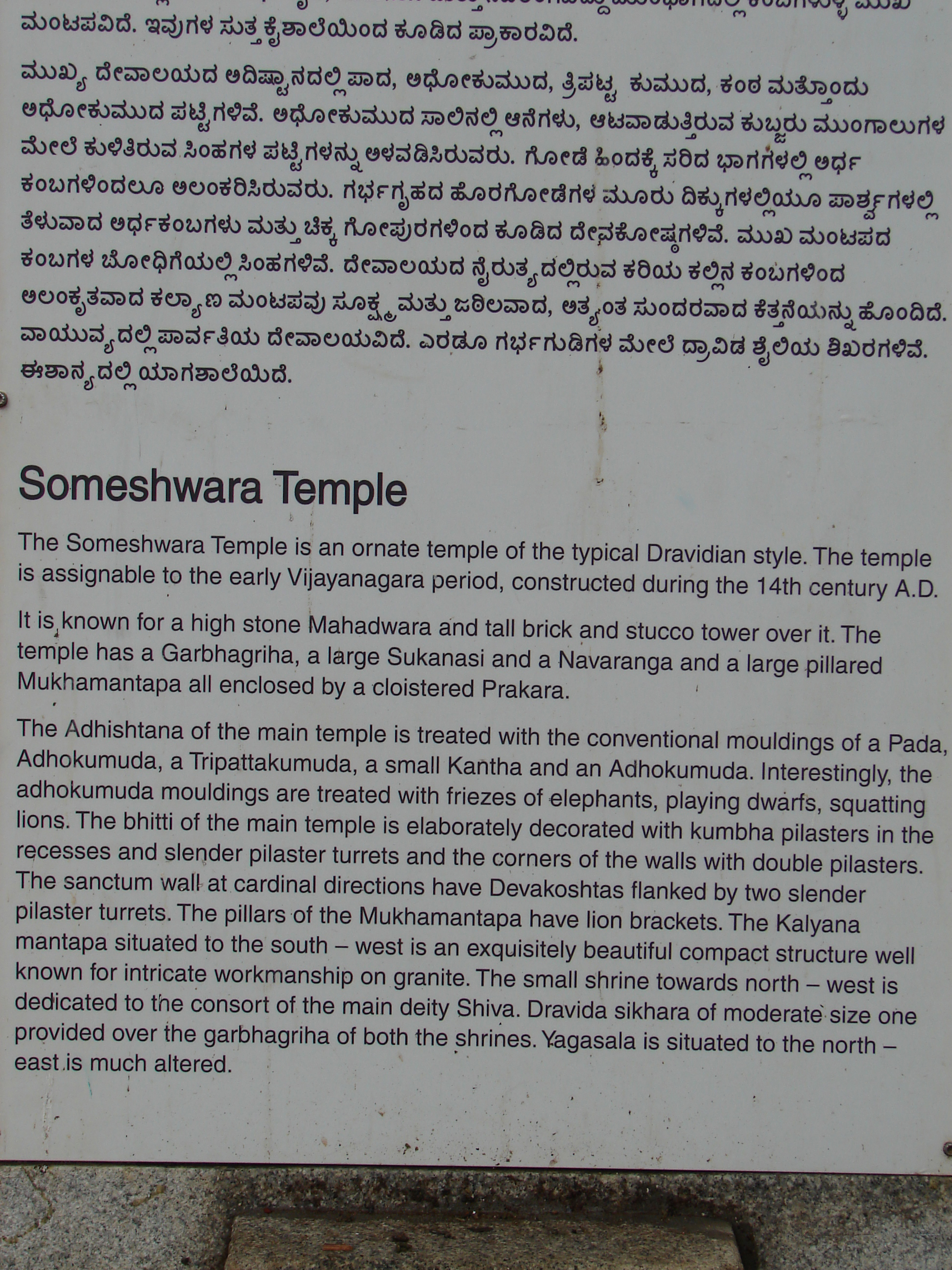
Archaeological Survey of India sign board, describing details of the Someshwara temple

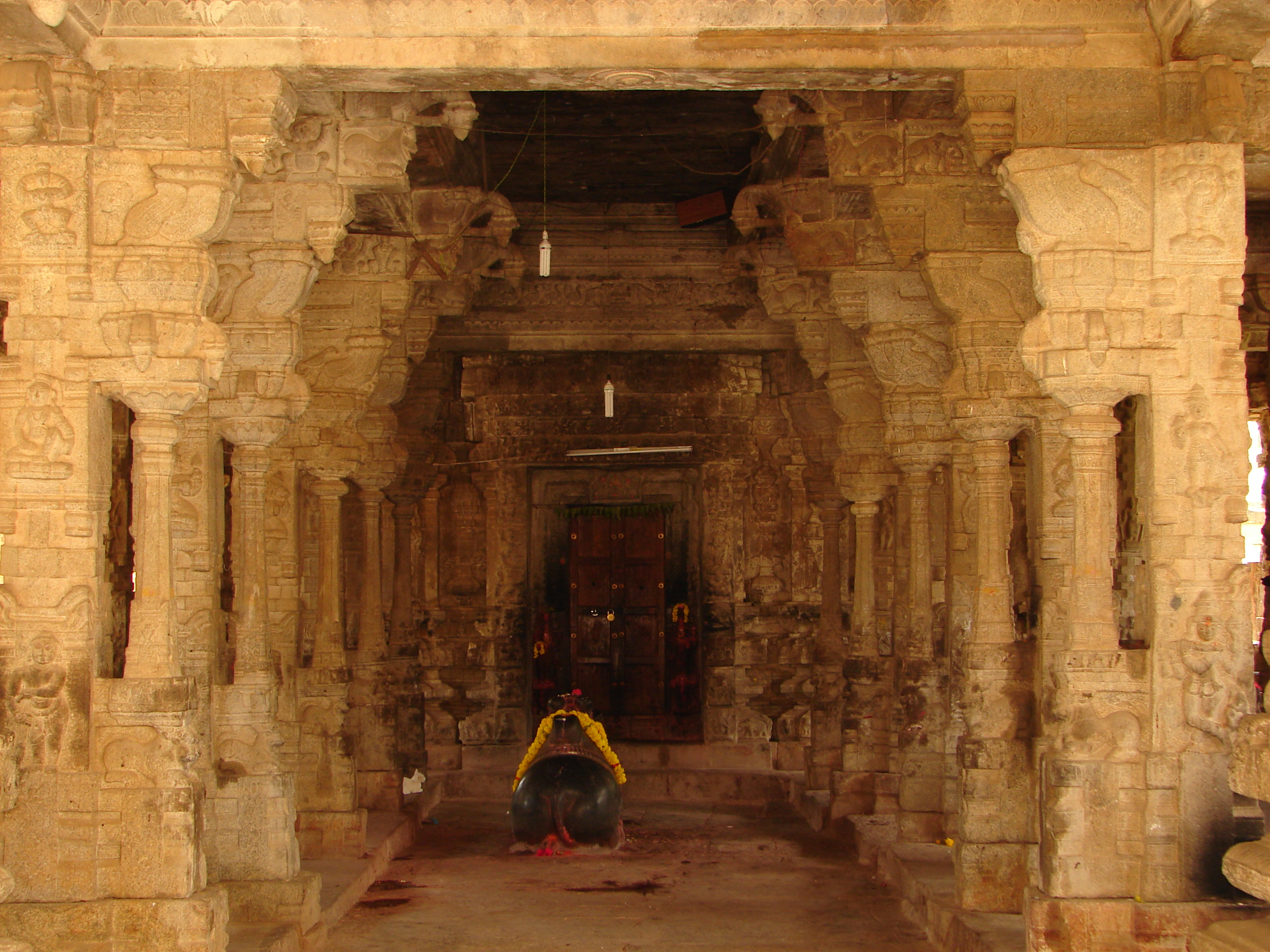
Open main mantapa (hall) leading to the sanctum in Someshwara temple at Kolar

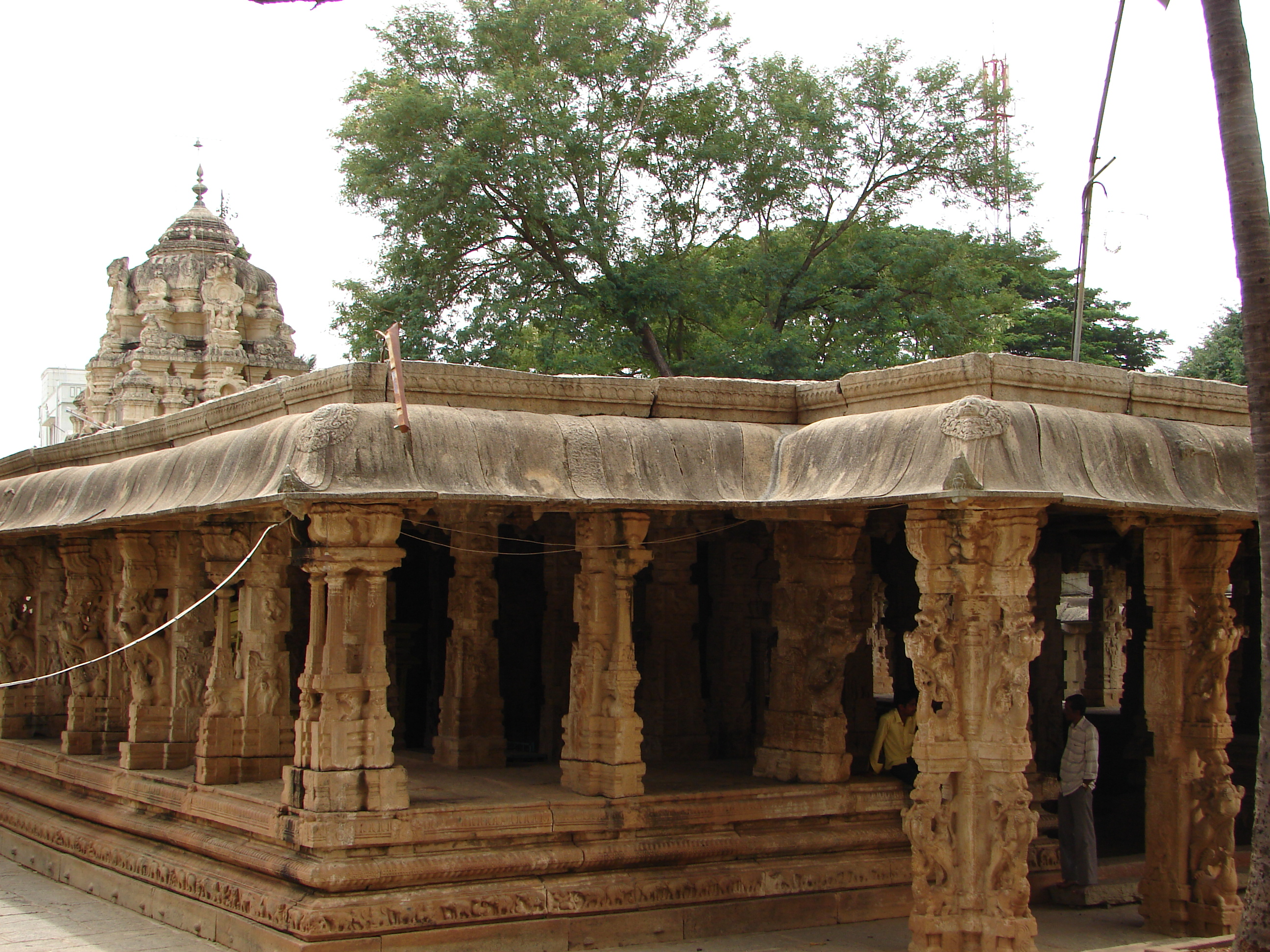
A profile of the front of the Someshwara temple at Kolar

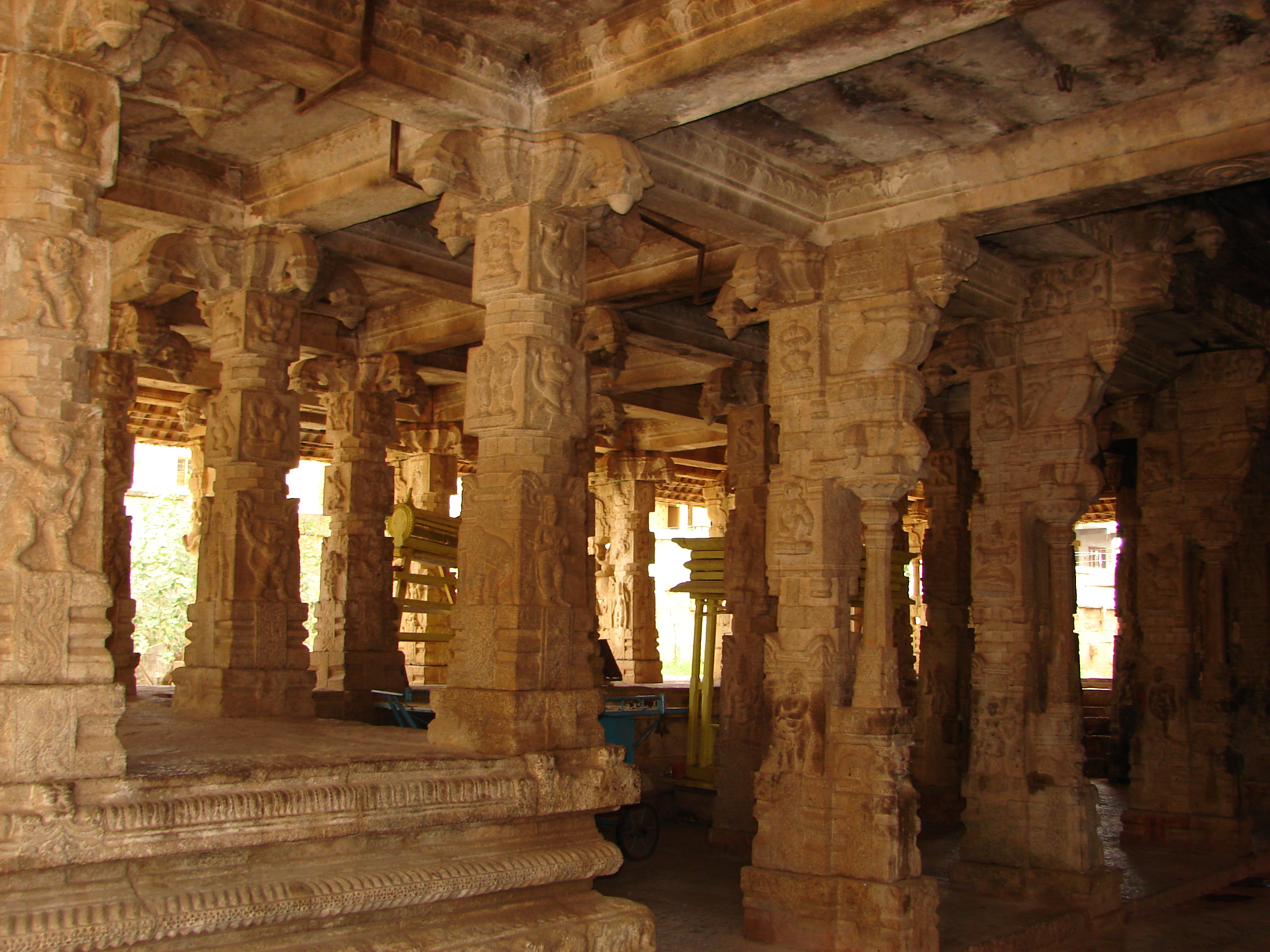
A view of the open mantapa in Someshwara temple at Kolar

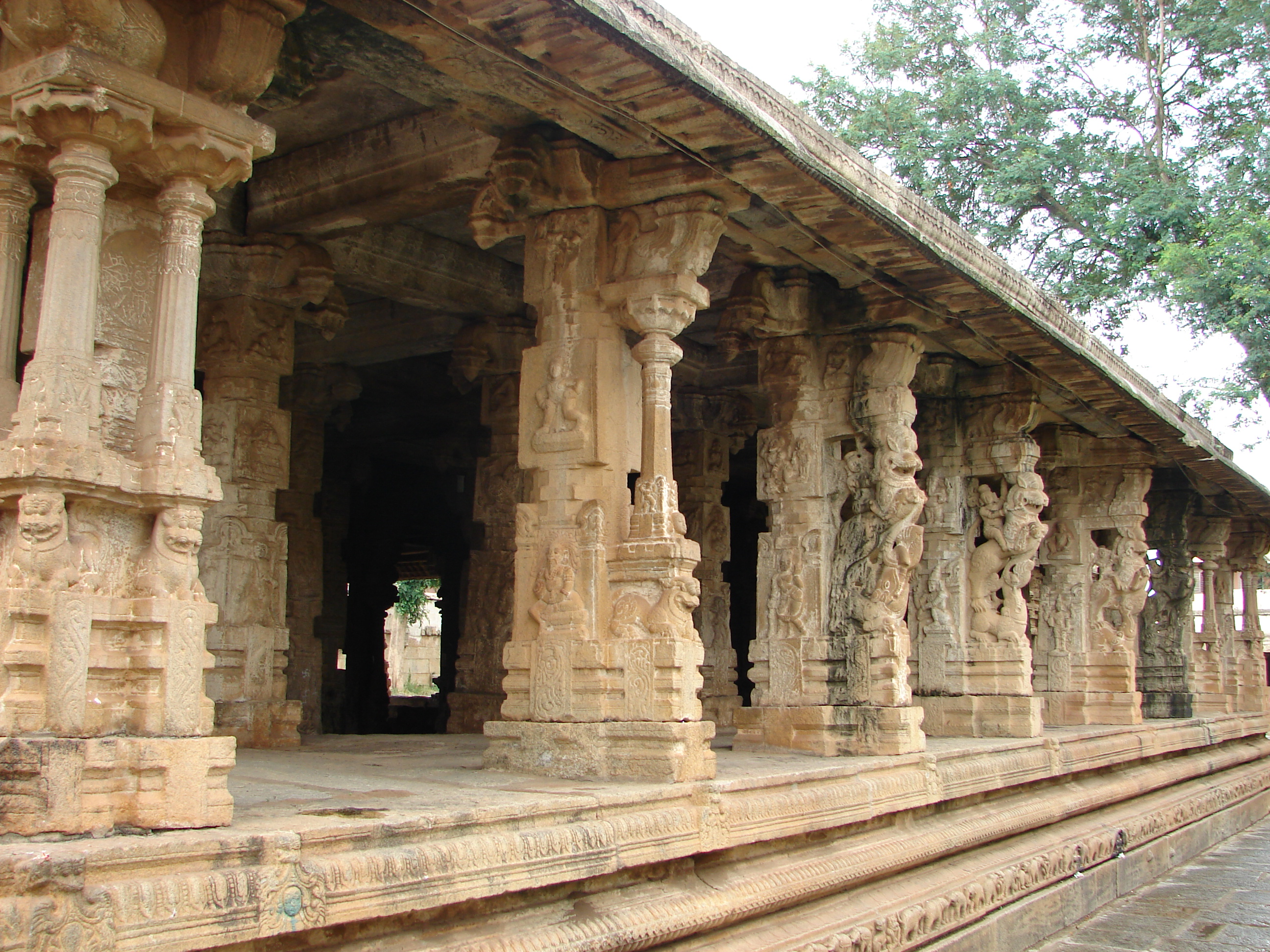
A view of the open mantapa in the Someshwara temple at Kolar

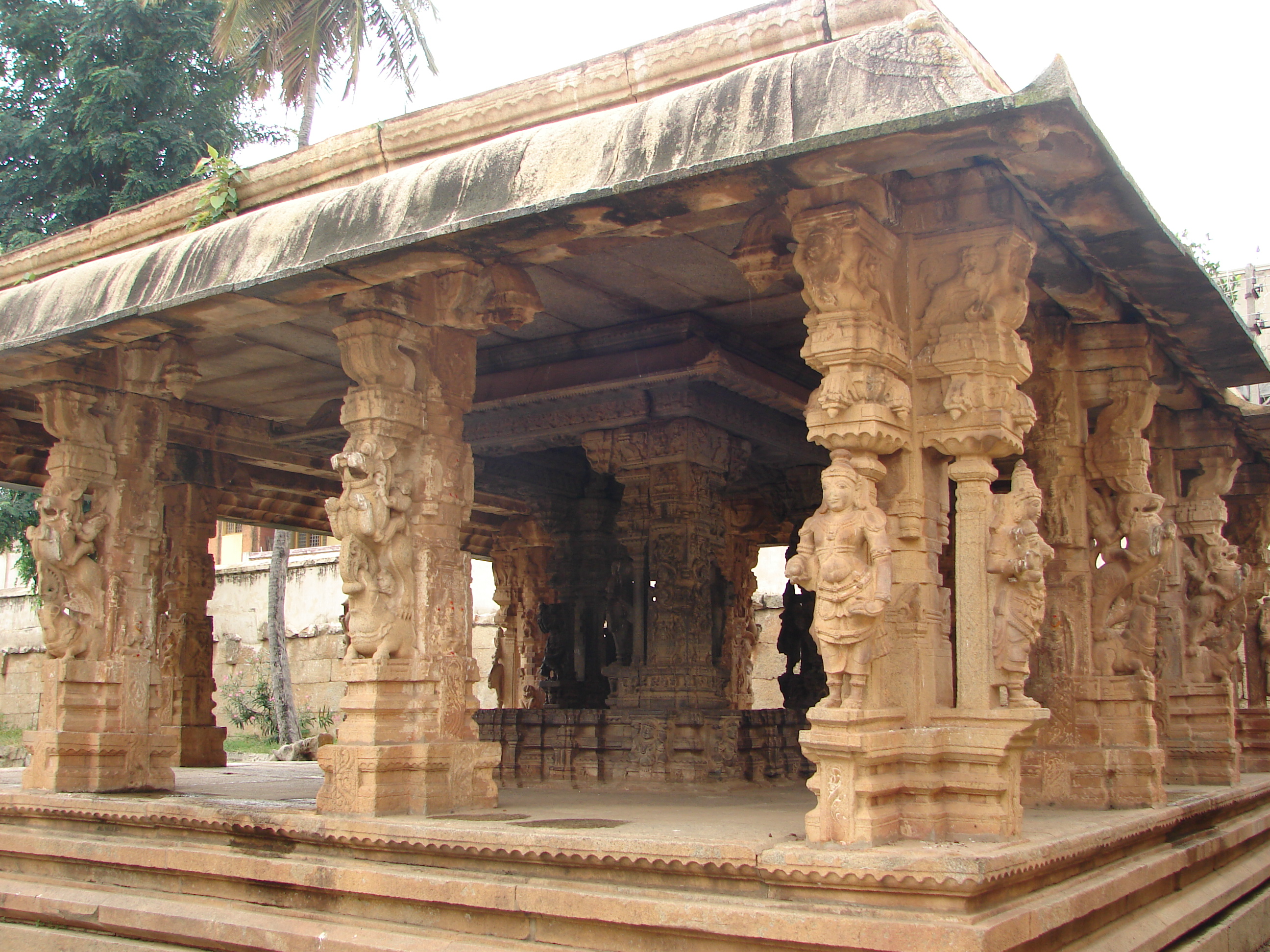
An ornate Kalyana mantapa at the rear of the complex in the Someshwara temple at Kolar

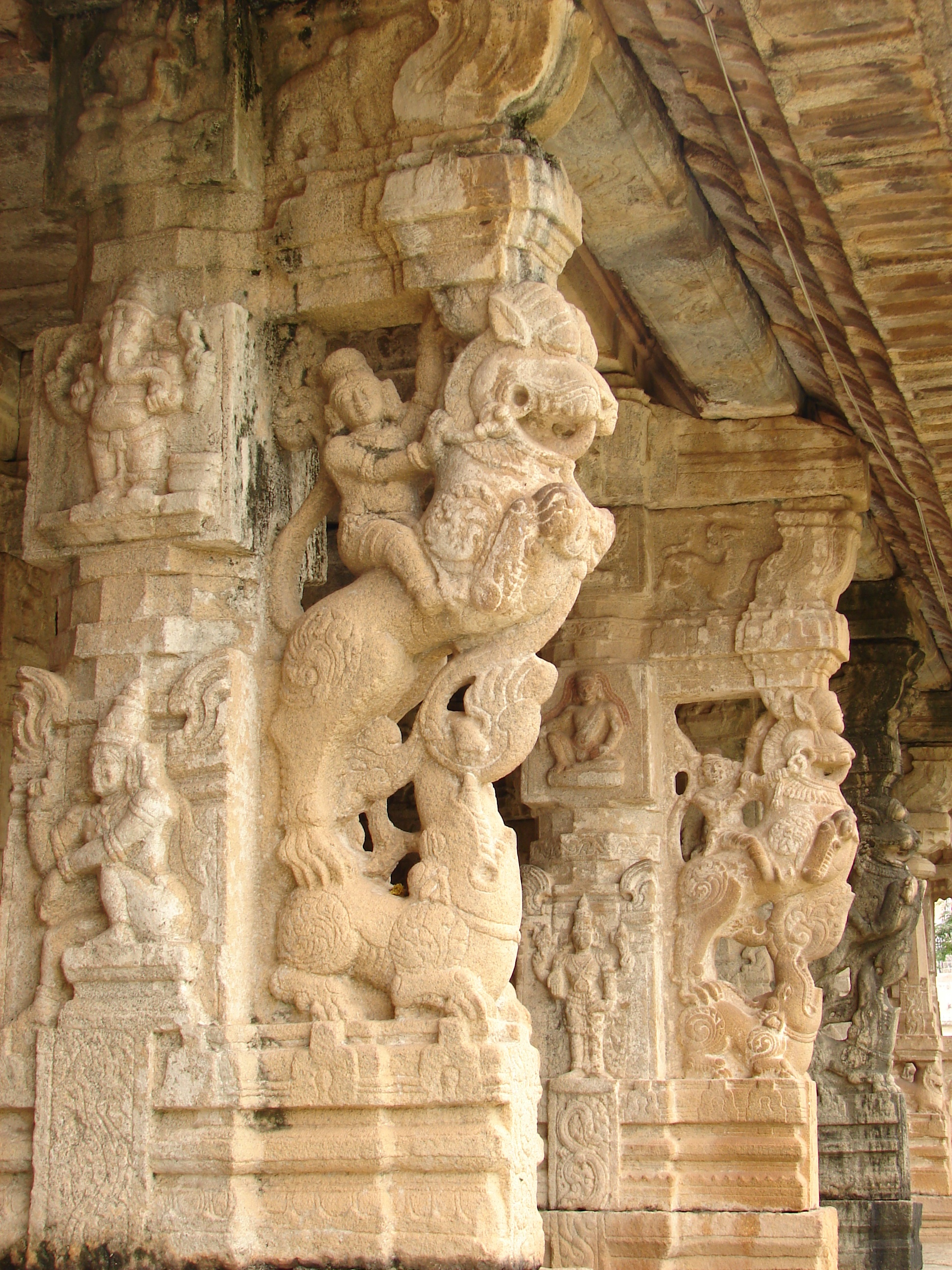
Yali pillars of the open mantapa in Someshwara temple at Kolar

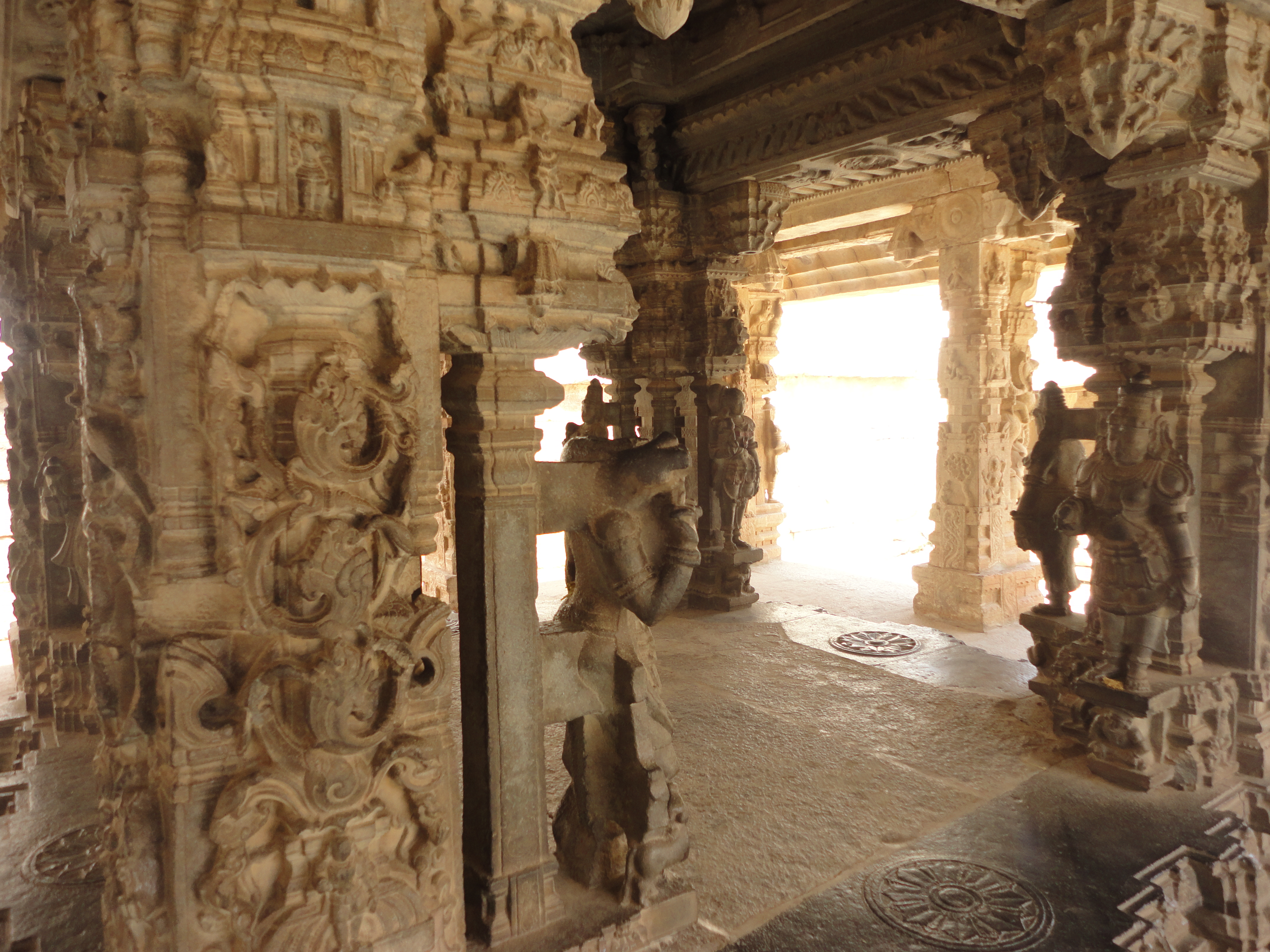
Decorative pillars of Kalyana mantapa with exquisite relief
