= Devarayasamudra =

Hamlet in Karnataka, India

Devarayasamudra is a hamlet some 90km outside of Bangalore in Karnataka, India. It lies between Kolar and Mulbagal on the Old Madras Highway.

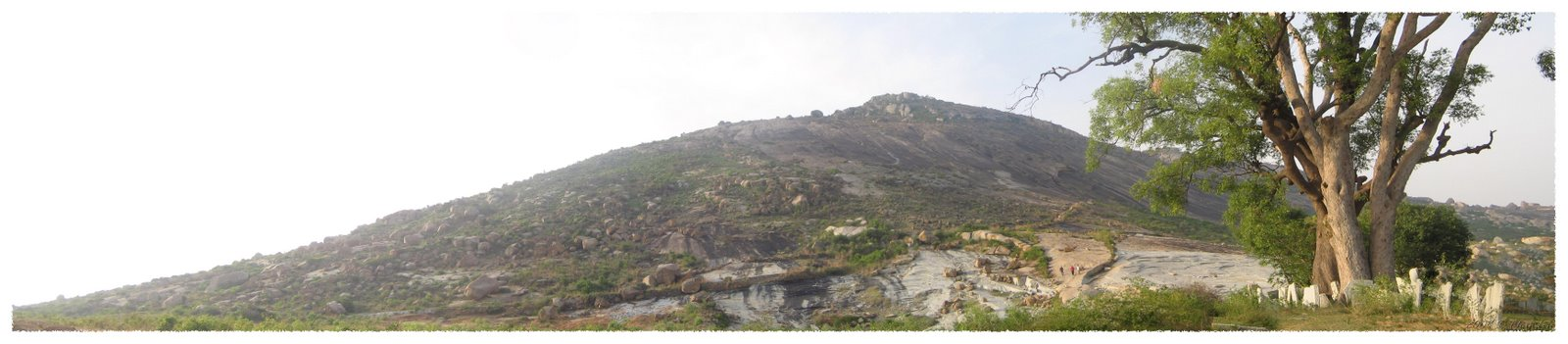
Devarayasamudra

Devarayasamudra is the main village in Ashtagrama (eight villages). These eight villages were allotted by the King of Vijayanagara Empire, Krishnadevaraya and hence the name Devarayasamudra. The Mysore government invited migrants from Tamil Nadu who were assigned to provide professional services for the government. They were mainly the Iyers (Brahmanas) from Tanjore who were pioneers in accounts, administration and also in culinary areas. It has many basic facilities including schools and ITI.
