= Chembakur =

- Village
- Nickname: Sambulinga patnam
- Interactive map of Chembakur
- Location in Andhra Pradesh, India
- Country: India
- State: Andhra Pradesh
- District: Annamayya
- Mandal: Ramasamudram

Languages
  - Official: Telugu
- Time zone: UTC+5:30 (IST)
- PIN: 517417
- Vehicle registration: Old number AP 03 New is AP 39

Chembakur is a village near Ramasamudram mandal, located in Annamayya district of the Indian state of Andhra Pradesh.

== Geography ==
Chembakur is located at 13.432°N 78.408°E. It has an average elevation of 500 metres (656 feet), and there is an unknown hill station nearby called Avulapalli konda, where the temperature falls to 5 °.

== Demographics ==
As of 2011 census, had a population of 4,537. The total population constitutes 2,261 males and 2,261 females —a sex ratio of 1007 females per 1000 males. 511 children are in the age group of 0–6 years, of which 250 are boys and 261 are girls —a ratio of 1044 per 1000. The average literacy rate stands at 78.66% with 2,755 literates, significantly higher than the state average of 67.41%.
