= Mulabagilu =

Mulabagilu Mulbagal
- Town
- Nickname: Eastern Door of Mysore Kingdom
- Location in Karnataka, India
- Coordinates: 13.1667°N 78.4°E
- Country: India
- State: Karnataka
- District: Kolar district

Area
  - Total: 8.5 km^{2} (3.3 sq mi)
- Elevation: 826 m (2,710 ft)

Population (2011)
  - Total: 57,276
  - Density: 5,180.35/km^{2} (13,417.0/sq mi)

Languages:
  - Official: Kannada
- Time zone: UTC+5:30 (IST)
- PIN: 563 131
- Telephone code: 08159
- Vehicle registration: KA-07

Mulabāgilu is a town and administrative center of Mulabagilu taluk, in the Kolar district in the state of Karnataka, India. The town is situated on the National Highway 75 and is the easternmost town of the state.

== Etymology ==
"Mulabagilu" (ಮುಳಬಾಗಿಲು) comes from the word mudalabagilu, which means the "eastern door" in the native Kannada language. Mulabagilu was supposedly the easternmost frontier of (and thereby the entrance to) the state of Mysuru.

== History ==
A local legend describes how the Hanuman temple was built by Arjuna, one of the Pandavas, after the Mahabharata war. Sage Vasishta is believed to have built the idols of the main deity Srinivasa, Padmavati and Rama-Sita-Lakshmana.

The history of Mulabagilu was compiled by Benjamin Lewis Rice, in his book "The Gazetteer of Mysore" (1887). The First sunrise place in India that way the name came mudala bagilu. Later it become a mulabagilu.

== Geography ==
Mulabagilu is located at 13.17°N 78.4°E. It has an average elevation of 827 metres (2,713 feet).

== Economy ==
The major sources of employment are in the agriculture, dairy, sericulture, floriculture and tourism-related industries. Farmers in Mulabagilu are completely dependent upon borewell water for irrigation and drinking. Mulabagilu is home to several famous temples, and is popularly known as the land of "Hoysalara hebbagilu." Many transport and travel businesses set up their base here. Mulabagilu is also famous for a variety of dosse called Mulabagal Dose. A lot of travellors especially bikers stop at Prasad hotel and Mulabagal Dosa Corner to get authentic taste of same. Mulabagilu has many sericuluture and vegetable trading markets, including potatoes, tomatoes (in Vadahalli), brinjal, beans, beetroot, carrots, chow-chow and cabbage. The state government of Karnataka acquired non-agriculture land for industrial development activities as part of an initial step the government proposed for a granite industries hub at Mulabagilu Taluk. Mulabagilu is known for tobacco beedis. Many brands of beedis are produced like mohan beedi, etc.; and distributed to Karanataka and Andhra Pradesh. The Muslim community is largely engaged in this business.

== Infrastructure ==
Mulabagilu is on NH-4, a newly-laid four-lane road from Bengaluru to Mulbagal-Nangali Karnataka border Kolar district, with a total length of around 110 km. Approximately 354 km of major roads connect other locations to this area. Indian Railways connectivity: Now mulabagal is getting a railway line and station under the project of Kadapa-Bangalore section (Till Kolar) new railway line.

== Demographics ==
As of 2001 India census, Mulabagilu had a population of 44,031. Males constitute 51% of the population and females 49%. Mulabagilu has an average literacy rate of 61%, higher than the national average of 59.5%. Male literacy is 67%, and female literacy is 54%. In Mulabagilu, 14% of the population is under 6 years of age.

== Notable people ==
- D. V. Gundappa, popularly known as DVG, was a prominent Kannada writer and a philosopher.
- N. Venkatachala, is a retired judge of the Supreme court of India and former Lokayukta of the state of Karnataka.
- Soundarya, a film actress and producer, was born in Ganjigunte village of Mulbagal taluk.

== See also ==
- Soorakunte, Uttanuru, Achampally, Byrakur, Hebbani,Nangali, Kurudumale, Dodda Athihalli located in Mulabagilu Taluk, Kolar District.
- Devarayasamudram, Avani, Kolar located in Mulabagilu Taluk, Kolar District.
