= Kolar district =

- District of Karnataka
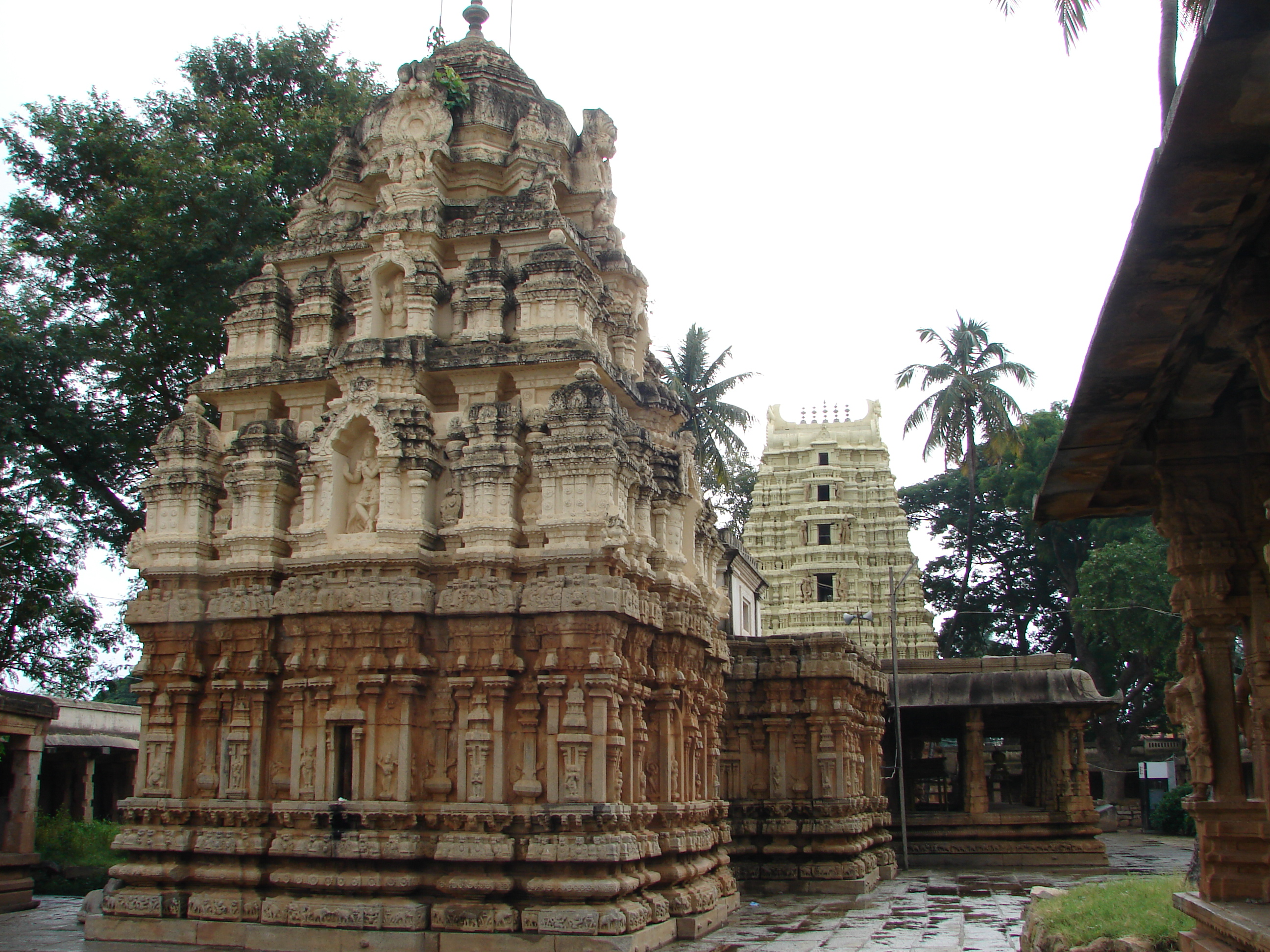
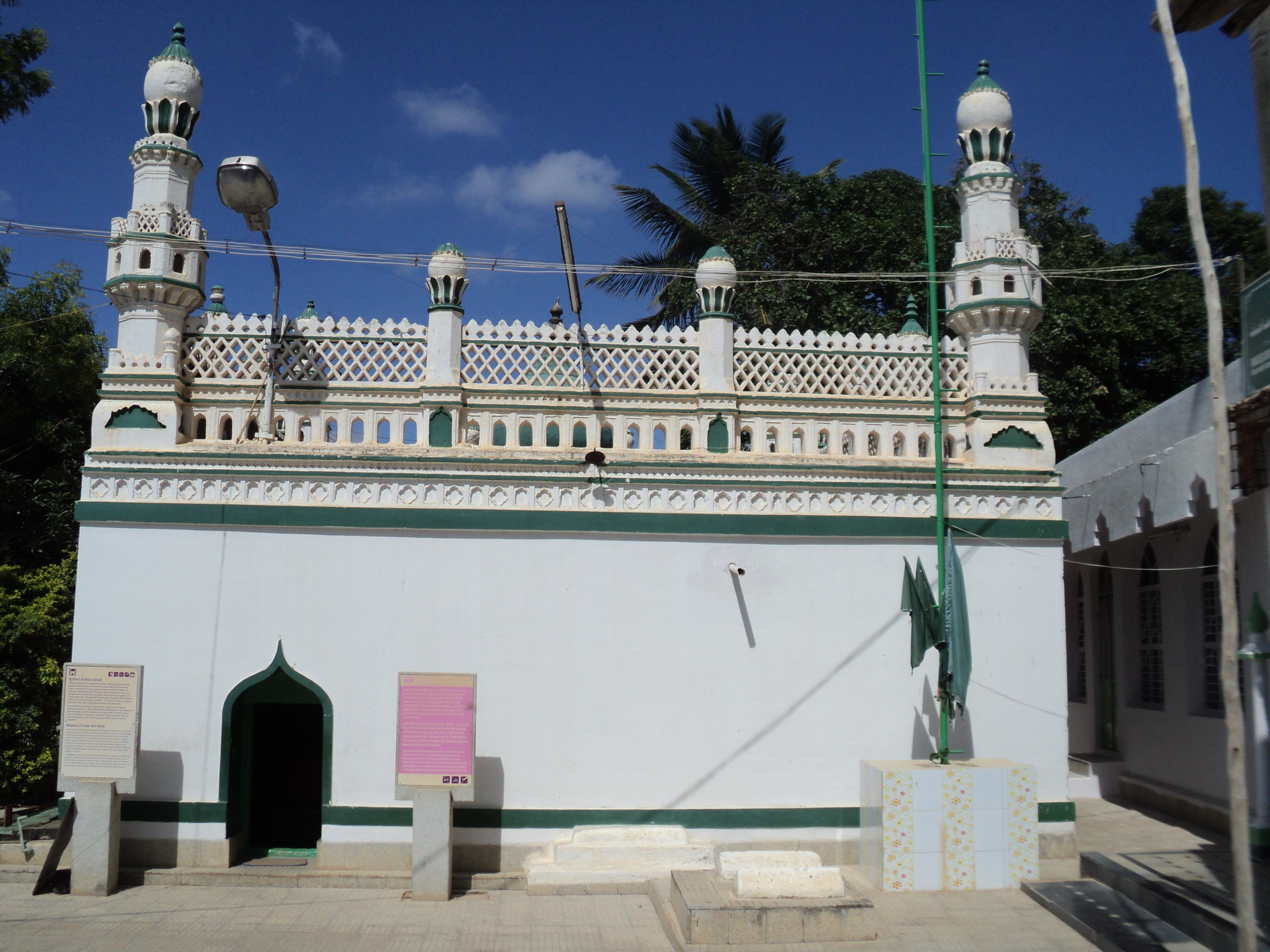
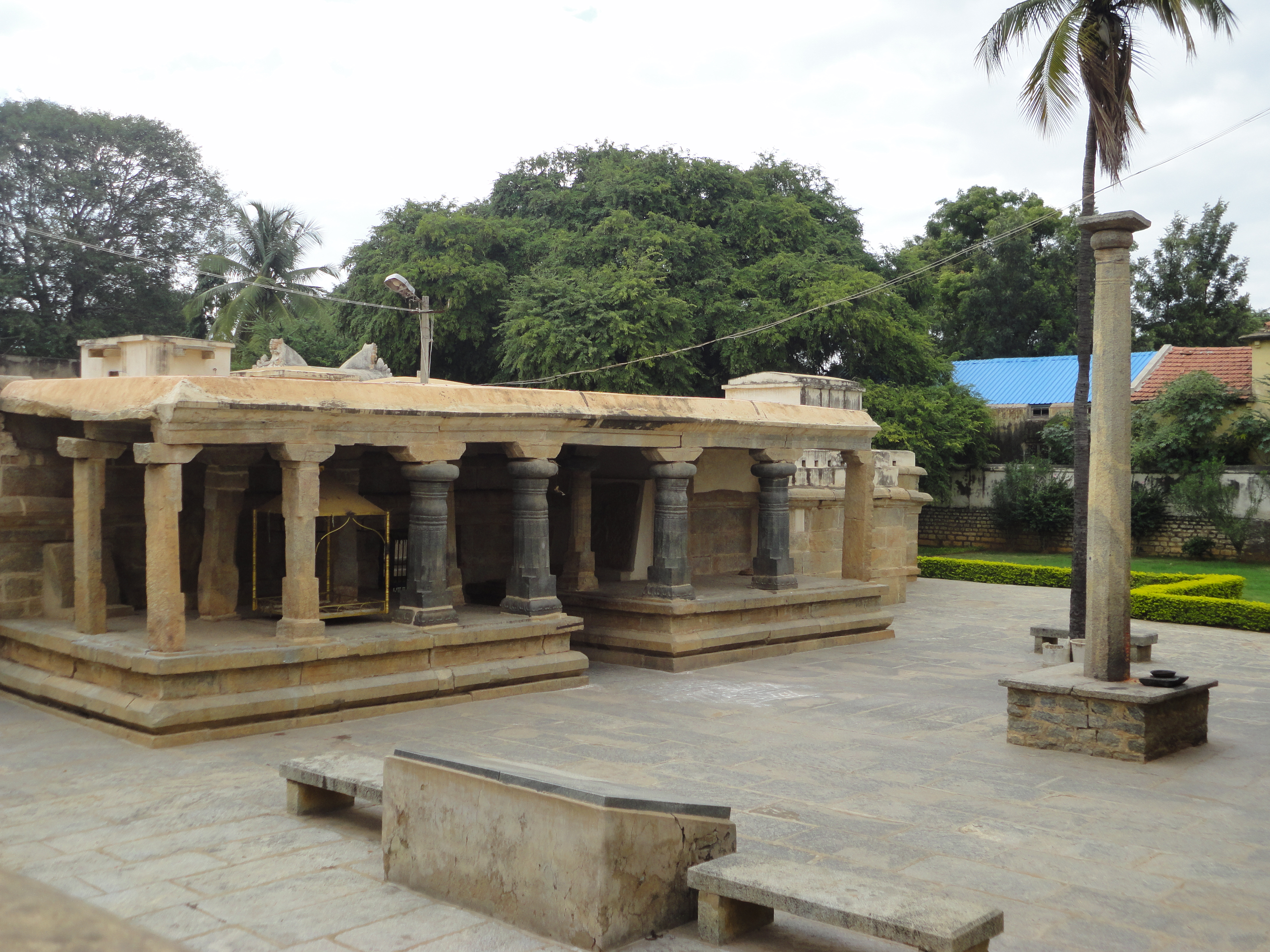
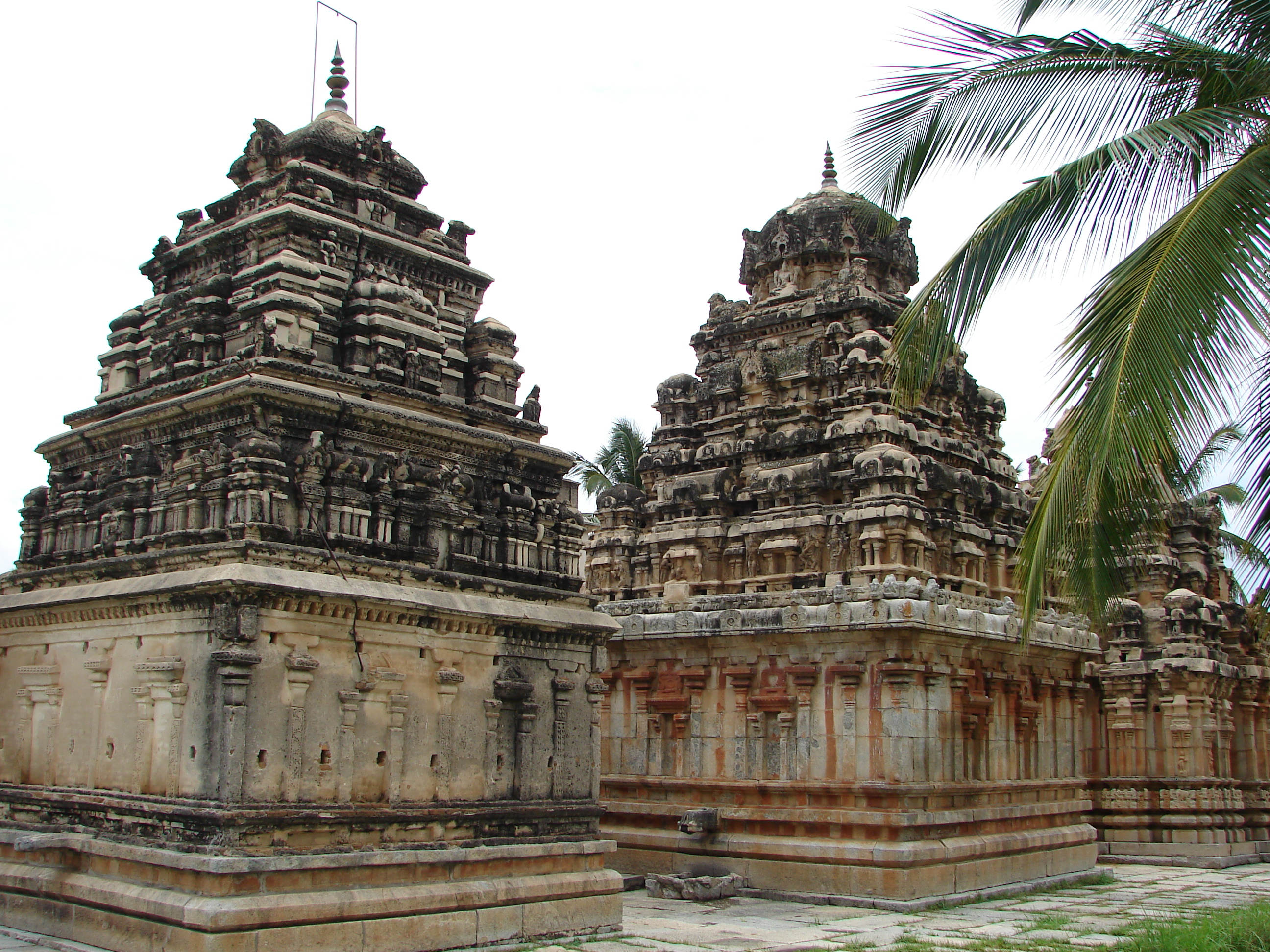
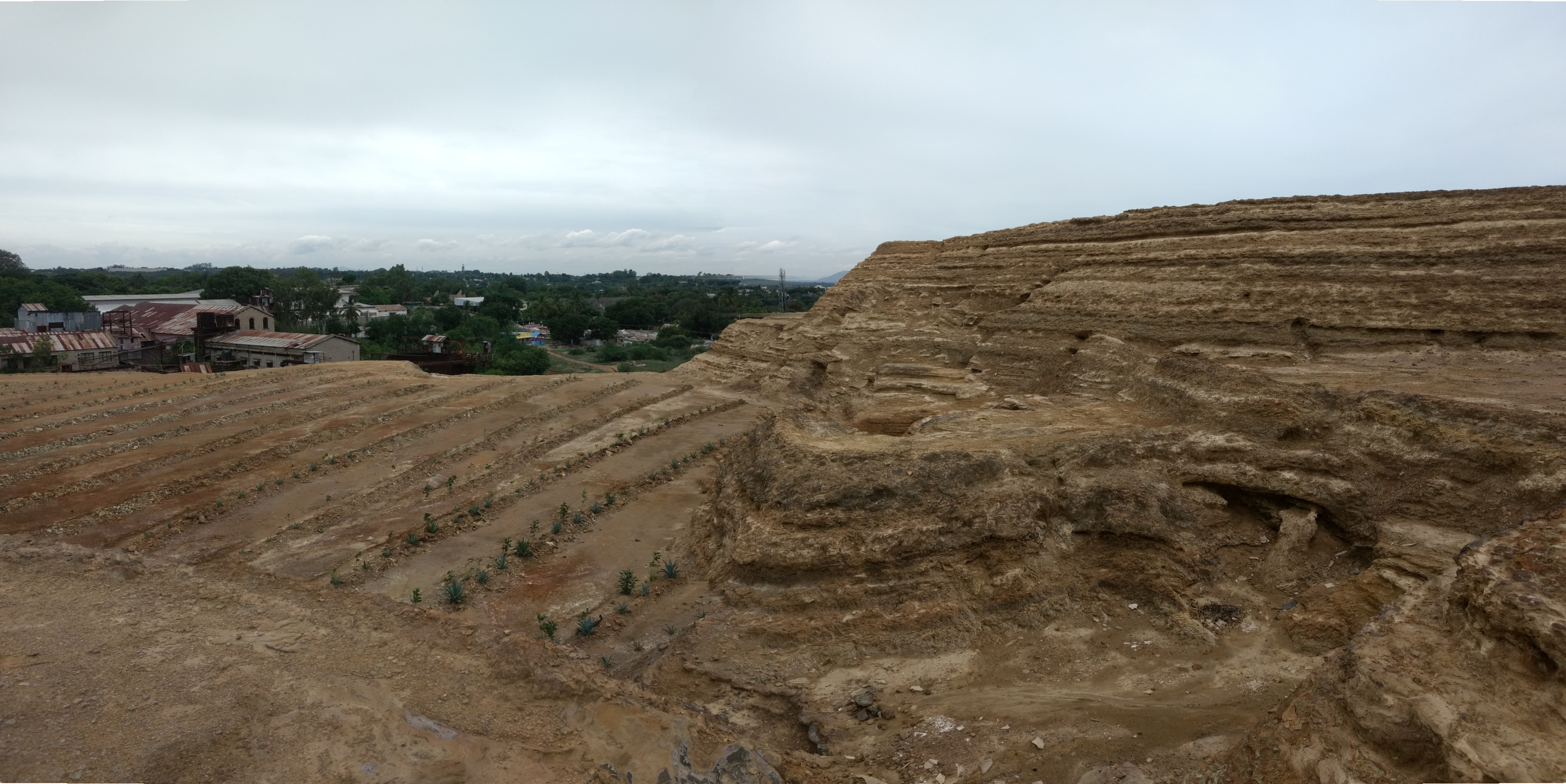
- Someshwara Temple in Kolar, Tomb of Hyder Ali father, Ramalingeshwara Temple at Avani, Mine waste in Kolar Gold Fields, Kolaramma Temple at Kolar

- Location in Karnataka
- Country: India
- State: Karnataka
- Division: Bengaluru
- Headquarters: Kolar

Government
  - District Commissioner: Mr Ravi MR (IAS)

Area^{†}
  - Total: 4,012 km^{2} (1,549 sq mi)

Population (2011)^{†}
  - Total: 1,536,401
  - Density: 384/km^{2} (990/sq mi)

Languages
  - Official: Kannada
- Time zone: UTC+5:30 (IST)
- ISO 3166 code: IN-KA-KL
- Vehicle registration: KA-07, KA-08
- Sex ratio: 976 ♀ / 1000♂
- Literacy: 74.33%
- Lok Sabha constituency: Kolar Lok Sabha constituency
- Precipitation: 724 millimetres (28.5 in)
- Website: kolar.nic.in

Kolar district (Kannada: [koːlaːrɐ]) is a district in the state of Karnataka, India.

Kolar (ಕೋಲಾರ) is the district headquarters. Located in southern Karnataka, it is the state's easternmost district. The district is surrounded by the Bangalore Rural district on the west, Chikballapur district on the north, the Chittoor district and Annamayya district of Andhra Pradesh on the east and the Krishnagiri district of Tamil Nadu on the south. As per the 2001 Census, Kolar had a total population of 2,536,069, comprising 1,286,193 males and 1,249,876 females, with a sex ratio of 972 females per 1000 males.

On 10 September 2007, it was bifurcated to form the new district of Chikkaballapura district. Due to the discovery of the Kolar Gold Fields, the district has become known as the "Golden Land" of India.

== History ==
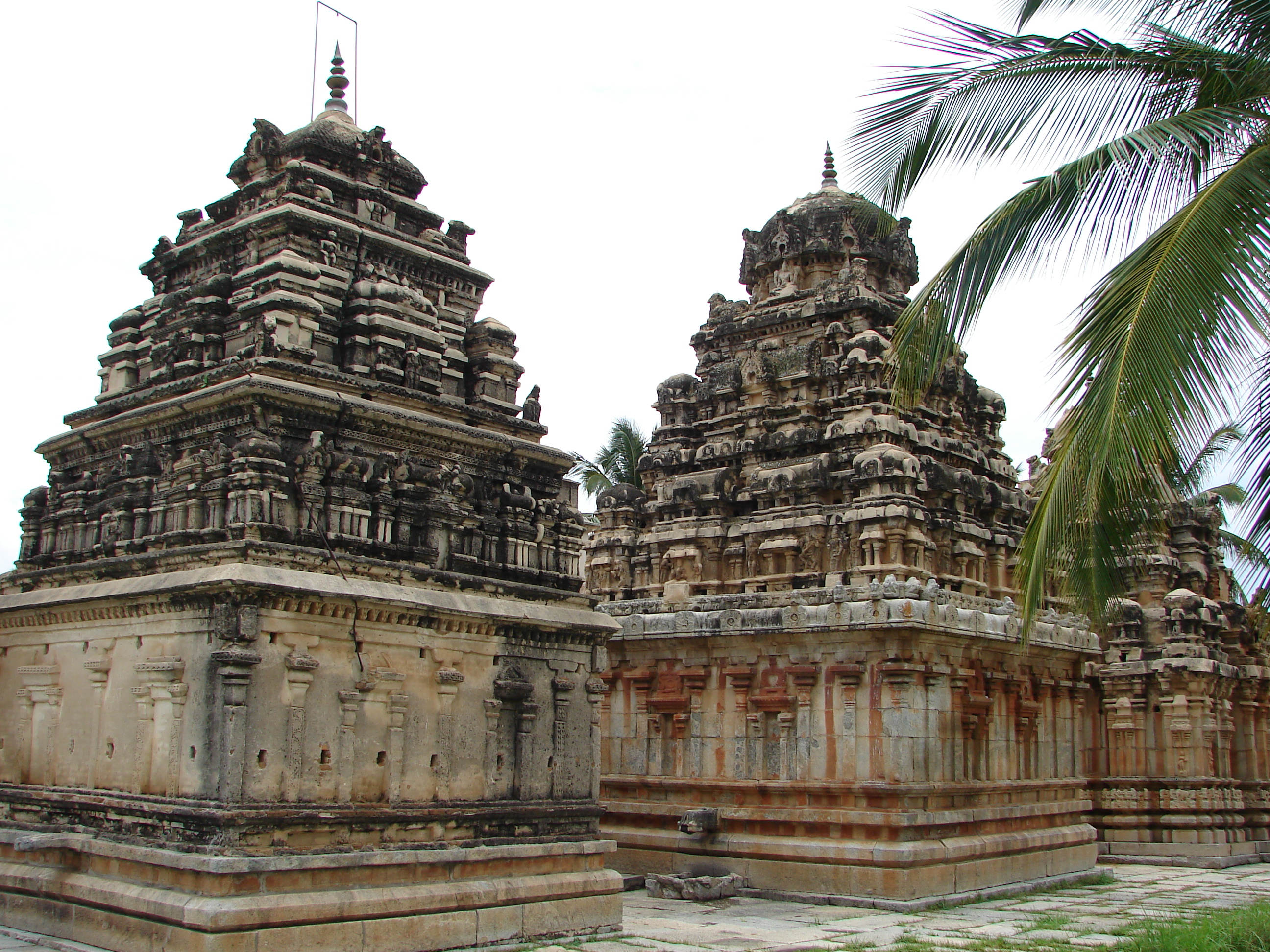
Tenth-century Nolamba dynasty Ramalingeshvara group of temples in Avani

Kolar, formerly known as Kolahala, Kuvalala and Kolala, was called Kolahalapura during the Middle Ages. In Kannada, kolahalapura means "violent city" and it was the battlefield for the warring Chalukyas in the north and the Cholas in the south. In 1004 AD, the Cholas annexed Kolar until 1116. Vishnuvardhana (1108-1142) freed Gangavadi from the Cholas and, to commemorate his victory, built the Chennakesava Temple at Belur.

Kolaramma and Someshwara are notable temples in Kolar. The Kolaramma temple, built in Dravida Vimana style during the second century, is dedicated to Shakti. It underwent renovations under Rajendra Chola I in the 10th century and the Vijayanagara kings in the 15th century. Someswara Temple is an example of 14th-century Vijayanagara art.

Kolar's early history was compiled by Fred Goodwill, superintendent of the Wesleyan Tamil mission in Bangalore and the Kolar Gold Fields, and his studies have been published in a number of journals. Older than Bangalore, Kolar dates back to the second century. The Western Gangas made Kolar their capital, ruling Mysore, Coimbatore, and Salem. During the 13th century Bhavanandi composed Nannool, his treatise on Tamil grammar.

Under the Cholas, King Sridhar kora (ruled 970–985) reportedly built the temple for Renuka and founded the city of Kolaahalapuram. Veera Chola, Vikrama Chola and Rajendra Chola I built stone structures with inscriptions at Avani, Mulbagal, Sitti Bettta and elsewhere. Chola inscriptions, which document the rule of Adithya Chola I (871-907), Raja Raja Chola I and Rajendra Chola I of Kolar, refer to Kolar as Nikarili Cholamandalam and Jayam Konda Chola Manadalam. Inscriptions from Rajendra Chola I also appear on the Kolaramma Temple. Many Siva temples were built in Kolar during the reign of the Cholas, including the Someshwarar and Sri Uddhandeshwari Temples at Maarikuppam Village, the Eswaran Temple at Oorugaumpet and the Sivan Temple at Madivala Village. Chola rule of Kolar lasted until 1116. The inscriptions are neglected, and some have been vandalised.

In 1117 Kolar became part of the Hoysala Empire; in 1254 it was bestowed to Ramanatha, one of King Someshwara's two sons. The Hoysala were defeated by the Vijayanagara Empire, which ruled Kolar from 1336 to 1664. During this period, the Sri Someshwara Temple at Kolar was built.

For 50 years in the 17th century Kolar was under Maratha rule as part of the Jagir of Shahaji, followed by 70 years of Muslim rule. In 1720 it became part of the Province of Sira, with Fateh Mohammed (the father of Hyder Ali) the province's Faujdar. Kolar was then ruled by the Marathas, the Nawab of Cuddapah, the Nizam of Hyderabad and Hyder Ali. It was under British rule from 1768 to 1770 before a brief Maratha rule followed by Hyder Ali. In 1791 Lord Cornwallis conquered Kolar and returned it to the Kingdom of Mysore in the peace treaty of 1792.

In the Kolar region, inscriptions document the reigns of the Mahavalis (Baanaas), the Pallavas and the Vaidumbaas. Benjamin Lewis Rice recorded 1,347 inscriptions in the Kolar District, in the 10th volume of his Epigraphia Carnatica, of the inscriptions, 422 are in Tamil, 211 in Telugu. But the oldest are in Kannada. This was the original language. Tamil came in with the Cholas in the 11th century, and Telugu with Vijayanagar kings after the 15th. The period covered by the inscriptions is from 4th to the 18th century.

== Taluks ==
- Kolar
- Bangarpet
- Malur
- Mulbagilu
- Srinivaspura
- Kolar Gold Fields

== Demographics ==
Historical population
Year	Pop.	±% p.a.
1901	392,651	—
1911	429,193	+0.89%
1921	436,066	+0.16%
1931	469,811	+0.75%
1941	555,545	+1.69%
1951	650,807	+1.60%
1961	721,822	+1.04%
1971	826,563	+1.36%
1981	1,044,394	+2.37%
1991	1,211,858	+1.50%
2001	1,387,062	+1.36%
2011	1,536,401	+1.03%
Source: District website

Religions in Kolar district (2011)
Religion	Percent
Hinduism	84.97%
Islam	13.01%
Christianity	1.74%
Other or not stated	0.28%

In the 2011 census, the district had a population of 1,536,401—roughly equal to that of Gabon or Hawaii. It ranked 324th of India's 640 districts). The district has a population density of 384 inhabitants per square kilometre (990/sq mi), with a growth rate of 11.04 percent from 2001 to 2011. Kolar's sex ratio is 976 females per 1,000 males. Its literacy rate is 74.33 percent. 31.25% of the population lives in urban areas. Scheduled Castes and Scheduled Tribes make up 30.32% and 5.13% of the population respectively. The district has 15 towns and a total of 3,321 villages (2,889 inhabited villages and 432 uninhabited).

Languages of Kolar district (2011)
1. Kannada (51.5%)
2. Telugu (22.7%)
3. Urdu (12.9%)
4. Tamil (11.0%)
5. Others (1.95%)

At the time of the 2011 census, 51.51% of the population spoke Kannada, 22.67% Telugu, 12.88% Urdu and 10.99% Tamil as their first language.

== Culture ==
The district's primary language is Kannada; Urdu, Tamil and Telugu are spoken by large minorities. Kolar Gold Fields (KGF) has an Anglo-Indian population. Festivals include the 13-day summer Karaga, celebrated in Kolar District, Kolar being one of the oldest Karaga traditions then followed in different regions of the district and usually beginning the first Friday after Ugadi; the water festival Theppothsava (Kolar Theppothsava), and Dyavara.

== Notable people ==
- L. Basavaraju - noted writer in Kannada
- D. V. Gundappa - Kannada poet
- B. K. S. Iyengar - founder of the "Iyengar Yoga" style of yoga, considered one of the foremost yoga teachers in the world.
- Masti Venkatesha Iyengar - Kannada writer and Jnanpith Award recipient
- Kumudendu Muni - Jain Digambara monk and author of the Siribhoovalaya
- K. H. Muniyappa - Former Union Minister of state for Indian Railways; represented Kolar in the Parliament of India for six terms
- N. R. Narayana Murthy - Chairman and Chief Mentor of Infosys Technologies Limited
- A. N. Prahlada Rao - author and crossword compiler
- K. C. Reddy - first Chief Minister of Karnataka
- Soundarya - South Indian film actress
- Picchalli Srinivas - popular singer and theatre personality
- Sir M. Visvesvaraya - Bharat Ratna and First Engineer of India

== Media ==
- Kolara Patrike - first Kannada daily newspaper
- Kolaravani - Kannada daily newspaper
- Kannada Thilaka – Kannada daily newspaper

== See also ==
- List of villages in Kolar district
- Our Lady of Victories Church, Kolar district, Karnataka
