= Someshwara =

Someshwara or its variant spellings Someshwar and Someshvara may refer to:

- Soma (deity), a Vedic Hindu deity
- Shiva, a Hindu deity

== People ==
- Someshvara I (died 1068), Indian king of the Western Chalukyas
- Someshvara II (reigned 1068–1076), Indian king of the Western Chalukya Empire
- Someshvara III (reigned 1126–1138), Indian king of the Western Chalukya Empire
- Someshvara IV (reigned 1181–1189), Indian king of the Western Chalukya Empire
- Someshvara (Chahamana dynasty) (reigned 1169–1177), Indian king of Sapadalaksha in what is now Rajasthan
- Someshvara (Shilahara dynasty) (reigned 1255–1265), Indian king of Konkan
- Vira Someshwara (reigned 1234–1263), Indian king of the Hoysala Empire
- Someshvara (13th-century poet), Indian poet from the Chaulukya kingdom of Gujarat
- Someswar Kakoti (fl. 1930–?), Indian independence activist from Assam

== Temples ==
- Someshwara Temple, Kolar, Hindu temple in Karnataka
- Halasuru Someshwara Temple, Bangalore, Hindu temple in Karnataka
- Someshvara Temple, Haranhalli, Hindu temple in Karnataka
- Someshwar Mahadev Temple, Hindu temple in Gujarat
- Someshwara Swamy Temple, Hindu temple in Bangalore, Karnataka
- Someshwara Temple, Marathahalli, Hindu temple in Bangalore, Karnataka
- Someswarar Temple, Hindu temple in Tamil Nadu
- Somesvara Siva Temple, Hindu temple in Odisha

== Places ==
- Someshwar, Karkala taluk, a village in Karnataka, India
- Someshwara Wildlife Sanctuary, Karnataka, India
- Someshwar (Uttarakhand), a city in Uttarakhand, India
  - Someshwar (Uttarakhand Assembly constituency)

== See also ==
- Someshwara Temple (disambiguation)
- Someswaram, a village in Andhra Pradesh
