= Someshwara Temple (disambiguation) =

Someshwara Temple can refer to these temples in Karnataka, India:

- Someshwara Temple, near Mangalore
- Someshwara Temple, Kolar
- Someshwara Temple, Lakshmeshwara
- Someshwara Temple, Marathahalli
- Someshvara Temple, Haranhalli
- Halasuru Someshwara Temple

== See also ==
- Someshwara (disambiguation)
- Somesvara Siva Temple, Odisha
