= Nilakantha Siva Temple =

Nilakantha Siva temple
- Location in Odisha

Religion
- Affiliation: Hinduism
- Deity: Mahishamardini

Location
- Location: Bhubaneswar
- State: Odisha
- Country: India
- Coordinates: 20°14′06″N 85°50′00″E

Architecture
- Type: Kalinga Architecture
- Completed: 11th century A.D.
- Elevation: 26 m (85 ft)

Nilakantha Siva temple is located in the Kharakhia Baidyanatha temple precinct, Kharakhia Vaidyanath Sahi, Old Town, Bhubaneswar. One can approach to this site on the left side of the Vaidyanath road leading from Lingaraja temple to Kapilesvara. This is a living temple and is facing towards the west. The enshrining deity of this temple is a Siva lingam within a circular yoni pitha at the centre of the sanctum sanatorium. The sanctum is 0.77 metres below the chandrasila.

== Description ==
The temple is at Lat- 200 14’ 06"N, Long- 850 50’ 00"E, Elev 85 ft. It dates to about the 11th century AD, and faces west. It is built of laterite using dry masonry methods. The precinct in which the temple is located is a private plot of Babulal Makaddam Badu Mohapatra, who is staying in the north-western corner of the temple precinct. Hence it is a private property.

The vimana is of rekha deul type whereas the jagamohana is inpidha deul. The temple is in use and Saivite rituals like Sivaratri, Sankranti are celebrated here. The temple is surrounded by a compound wall. The other temples within the precinct are Markandesvara and Somesvara in south, Samesvar building in west.

On plan, the temple has a vimana and a jagamohana. Both Vimana and Jagamohana are square on plan measuring 4.00 square metres and 5.32 square metres respectively. The ganthiala measures 0.47 metres. The cella measures 1.85 square metres. The vimana is pancharatha with a central raha and a pairs of anuratha and kanika pagas on either side of the raha. On elevation, the vimana is of rekha order with usual bada, andi and mastaka that measures 8.64 metres in height from pabhaga to kalasha. The Jagamohana is of pidha order that measures 6.14 metres in height from bottom to the top. The bada of both vimana and Jagamohana is panchanga measuring 2.64 metres and 2.04 metres in height respectively. The pabhaga of the vimana measures 0.66 metres, talajangha and upara jangha measures 0.47 metres and 0.47 metres each divided by a bandhana measuring 0.28 metres. The baranda measures 0.76 metres. The gandi and mastaka measures 4.00 metres and 2.00 metres in height respectively. The pabhaga, talajangha, bandhana, upara jangha and baranda of the Jagamohana measures 0.47 metres, 0.42 metres, 0.20 metres, 0.46 metres and 0.49 metres in height respectively. The gandi measures 2.50 metres and mastaka 1.60 metres. The gandi has five receding tiers.

=== Raha niche and parsva devatas ===
The Parsvadevata niches are located on the raha paga of the talajangha on the three sides of east, north and south that measures 0.66 metres in height x 0.38 metres in width X 0.19 metres in depth. While the eastern and northern raha niches enshrine four armed Kartikeya and four armed Parvati. The southern niche is empty. Kartikeya standing over a lotus pedestal in tribhanga pose is holding a spear in his upper right hand, his lower right hand is broken, left two hands are resting over the cock which is resting over the right hand of the female attendant on the left side. Kartikeya has a jatamukuta and his mount peacock is broken. Parvati standing over a lotus pedestal is holding a spear in her lower left and a nagapasa in lower right hand. Her upper left and right hands are broken. There is a female attendant on the right side of the pedestal.

=== Decorative features ===
Due to the cement plaster all over the structure the decorative programme is concealed.

=== Door Jambs ===
The doorjambs of the temple (vimana and jagamohana) measures 1.67 metres in height X 1.20 metres in width. It is decorated with scroll works like patra sakha, lata sakha and puspa sakha from exterior to interior and vice versa. Each sakha measures 0.08 metres in breadth. At the base of the doorjamb Saivite dvarapalas are housed in khakhara mundi niche that measures 0.18 metres in height X 0.8 metres in width. They holds trident in their left hand and right hand is in varada mudra.

=== Lintel ===
The lintel measures 1.20 metres and in the lalatabimba Gajalaxmi is seated in lalitasana. Above the doorjambs is a graha architrave carved with the traditional navagrahas with the iconography of the mature phase.

=== Style ===
Kalingan

== State of preservation ==
=== Good/Fair/ Showing Signs of Deterioration/Advanced ===
Good, except for the growth of vegetation and wild grasses in all around the temple.

== Condition description ==
=== Repairs and Maintenance ===
The temple was repaired by Orissa State Archaeology under X and XI Finance Commission Award.

== Grade (A/B/C) ==
i) Architecture: B ii) Historic: C iii) Associational: C iv) Social/Cultural: B v) Others: —

== Threats to the property ==
Conservation Problem and Remedies: No immediate threat except the vegetation.

=== Detached Sculptures ===
Two detached Siva ganas are there near the eastern wall of the temple. They are four armed and with jatamukuta. They hold tridents in their lower left, dambaru in lower right, abhaya mudra in upper left and upper right hand in varada mudra. There is also a broken monolithic Naga pillar near these images. It measured 1.40 metres in height with the thickness 0.60 metres.

=== Date of Documentation ===
09.09.2006

=== Documenter ===
Dr. Sadasiba Pradhan and team
