= Ashta Someswaras =

Eight lingas around Draksharamam

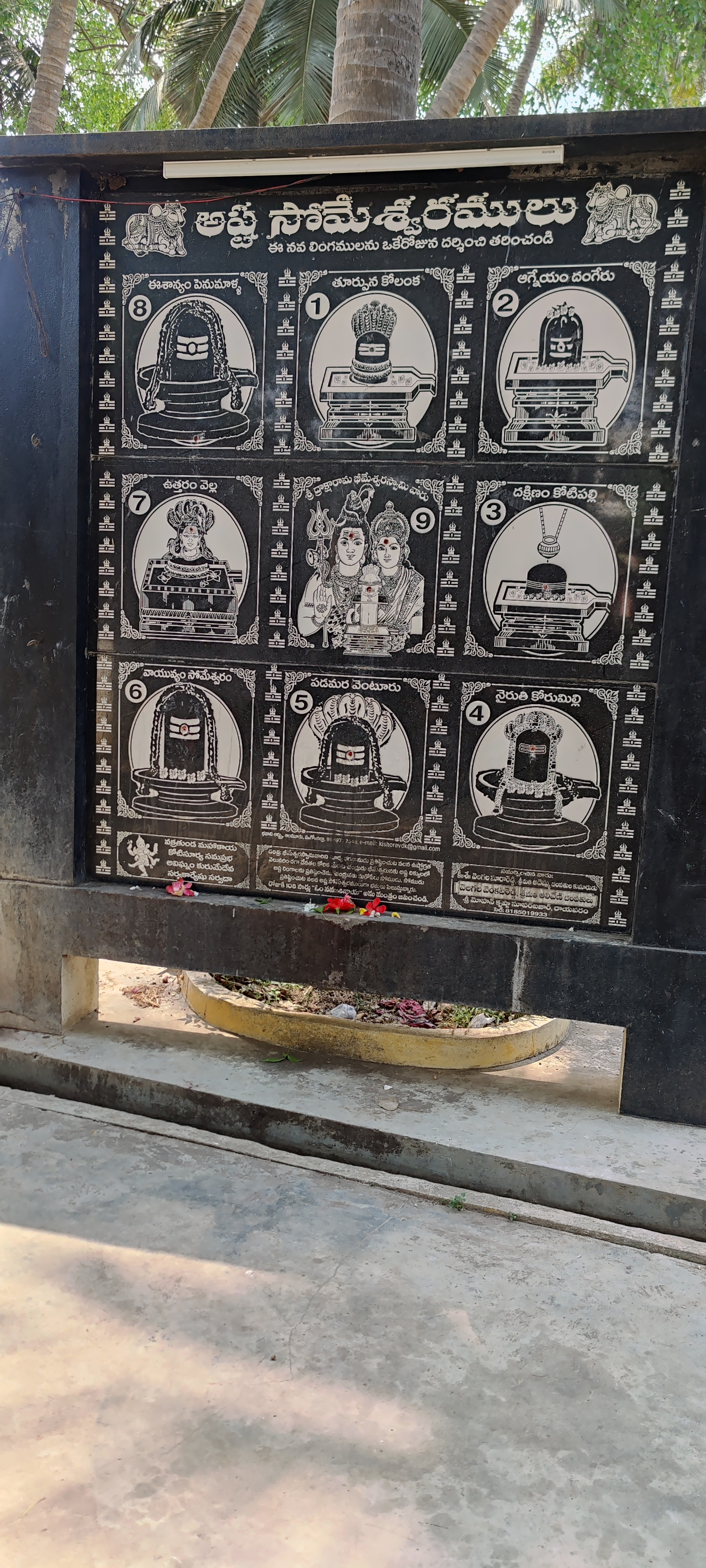
A plaque in Someswaram showing the locations of the Ashta Someswaras, the nava lingas, and the story behind their consecration.

The Ashta Someswaras (అష్ట సోమేశ్వరములు, Telugu: [aʂʈa soːmeːçʋaɾamulu]) refer to eight Shiva lingas consecrated in the eight directions (cardinal and inter-cardinal) around Draksharamam, a village in Andhra Pradesh, India.

== Etymology ==
Ashta in Sanskrit means eight. Soma means the moon. Ishvara means lord, and epithet of the deity Shiva. The name refers to eight lingas consecrated by the moon god.

== Legend ==
According to regional tradition, the origin of temples is as follows: The linga in Draksharamam is said to have been consecrated by the sun god Surya. This resulted in rise of atmospheric temperatures in the surrounding regions. To control these high temperatures, the moon god Chandra consecrated eight lingas in the eight directions of Draksharamam. The Dhraksharama lingam, along with these eight lingas together, are known as nava (nine) lingas. Visiting these nava lingas on the same day is believed to be a holy act.

== Locations ==
With Draksharamam as reference point, the location of lingas is as follows:

1. North: Vella
2. South: Kotipalli
3. East: Kolanka
4. West: Venturu
5. North-East: Penumaalla
6. North-West: Someswaram
7. South-East: Dangeru
8. South-West: Korumilli

== See also ==
- Pancharama Kshetras
