= Duvvuri Subbamma =

Indian independence activist

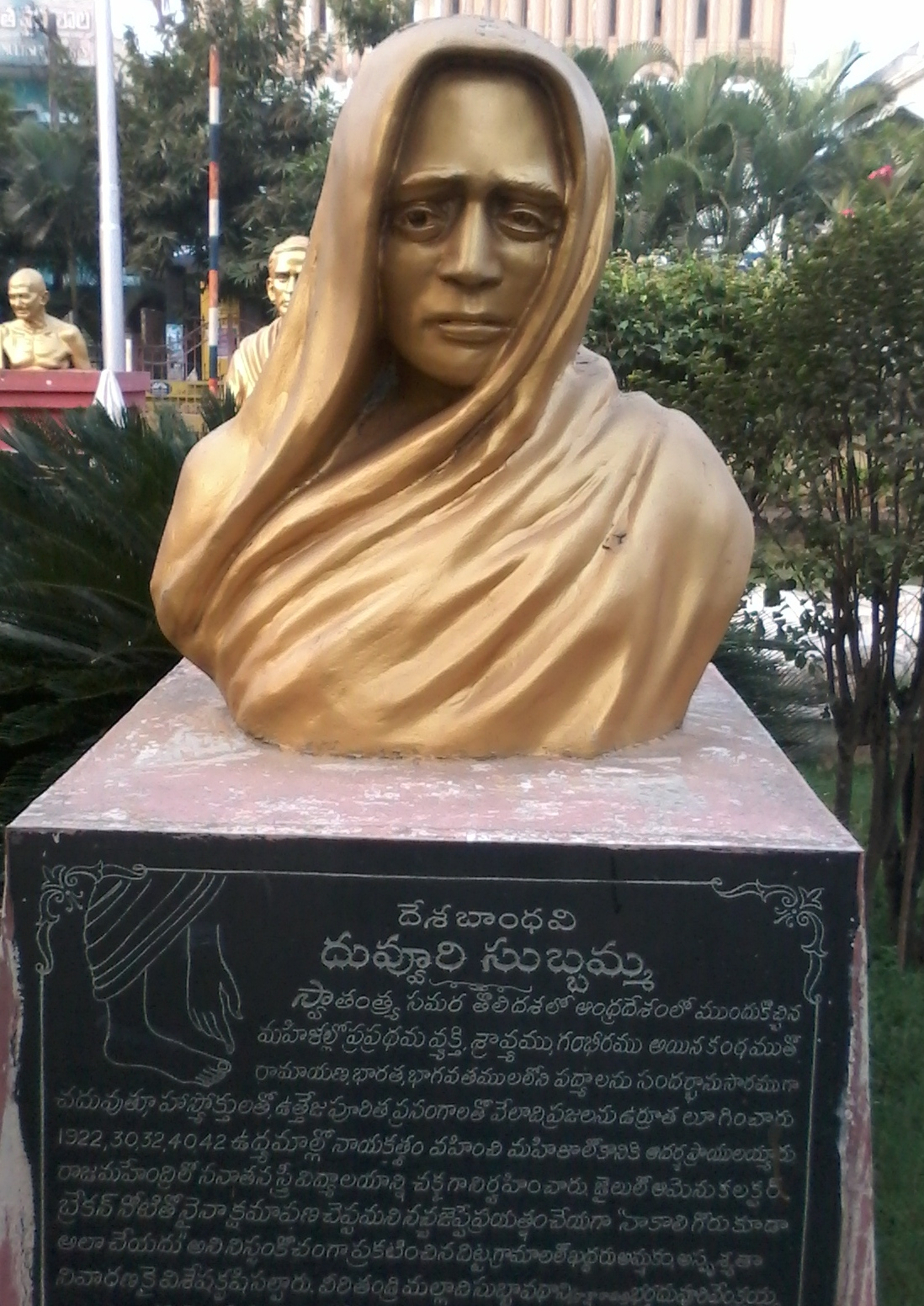
- Memorial to Duvvuri Subbamma in the Freedom Park in Rajahmundry, India
- Born: 15 November 1880; Daksharamam, East Godavari district, Andhra Pradesh, India
- Died: 31 May 1964 (aged 83)

Duvvuri Subbamma (15 November 1880 – 31 May 1964) was an Indian independence activist who played an important role in the Indian independence movement. She was one of the founders of the women's congress committee.

== Biography ==
Subbamma was born in 1880 in Draksharamam, East Godavari district, Andhra Pradesh. A child bride, she was married at the age of ten. She was widowed at a very young age. After her husband's death, she took up activism and joined the Quit India Movement against the British Raj. She took part in the civil disobedience movement and strongly advocated total freedom from British rule in India.

In 1922, she organized the women's congress committee. In 1923, she organized a meeting in Kakinada, Andhra Pradesh, where hundreds of women volunteers attended the Kakinada Congress Mahasabha. Subbamma organized Andhra Mahila Sabhas that trained and educated women in the national freedom movement and was instrumental in galvanizing support of the women in the Indian independence movement. She extensively traveled throughout Andhra Pradesh promoting women's empowerment.

Together with other activists like Nadimpalli, Sundaramma helped set up the Goteti Manikyamba, Andhra Mahasabha, and T. Varakshmamma organizations. Subbamma was arrested and incarcerated in the Rajahmundry prison for one year due to her activities on behalf of the civil disobedience movement. She also spent a year in the Rayavellore prison for taking part in the Salt March. She aggressively spoke out and worked for the abolition of untouchability in India.

She is memorialized with a bust in the Freedom Park in Rajahmundry.
