= Draksharamam =

Coordinates: 16.7928°N 82.0635°E

Draksharamam Draksharama, Dhakshavatika, Dhakshatapovana
- Village
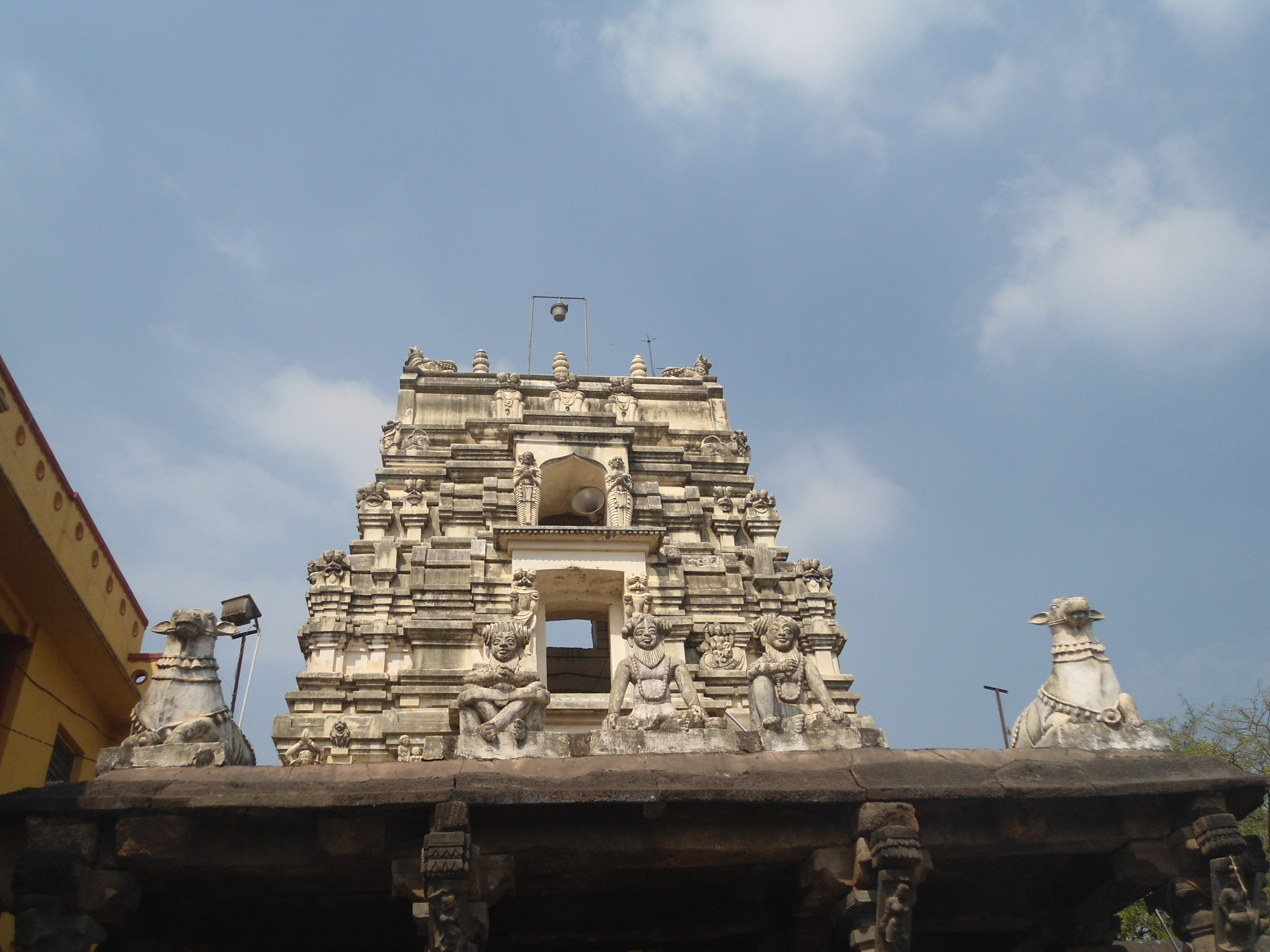
- Draksharama Gopuram ద్రాక్షారామ గోపురం

- Location in Andhra Pradesh, India
- Country: India
- State: Andhra Pradesh
- District: Konaseema

Population (2011)
  - Total: 9,299

Languages
  - Official: Telugu
- Time zone: UTC+5:30 (IST)
- Postal code: 533262
- Vehicle registration: AP

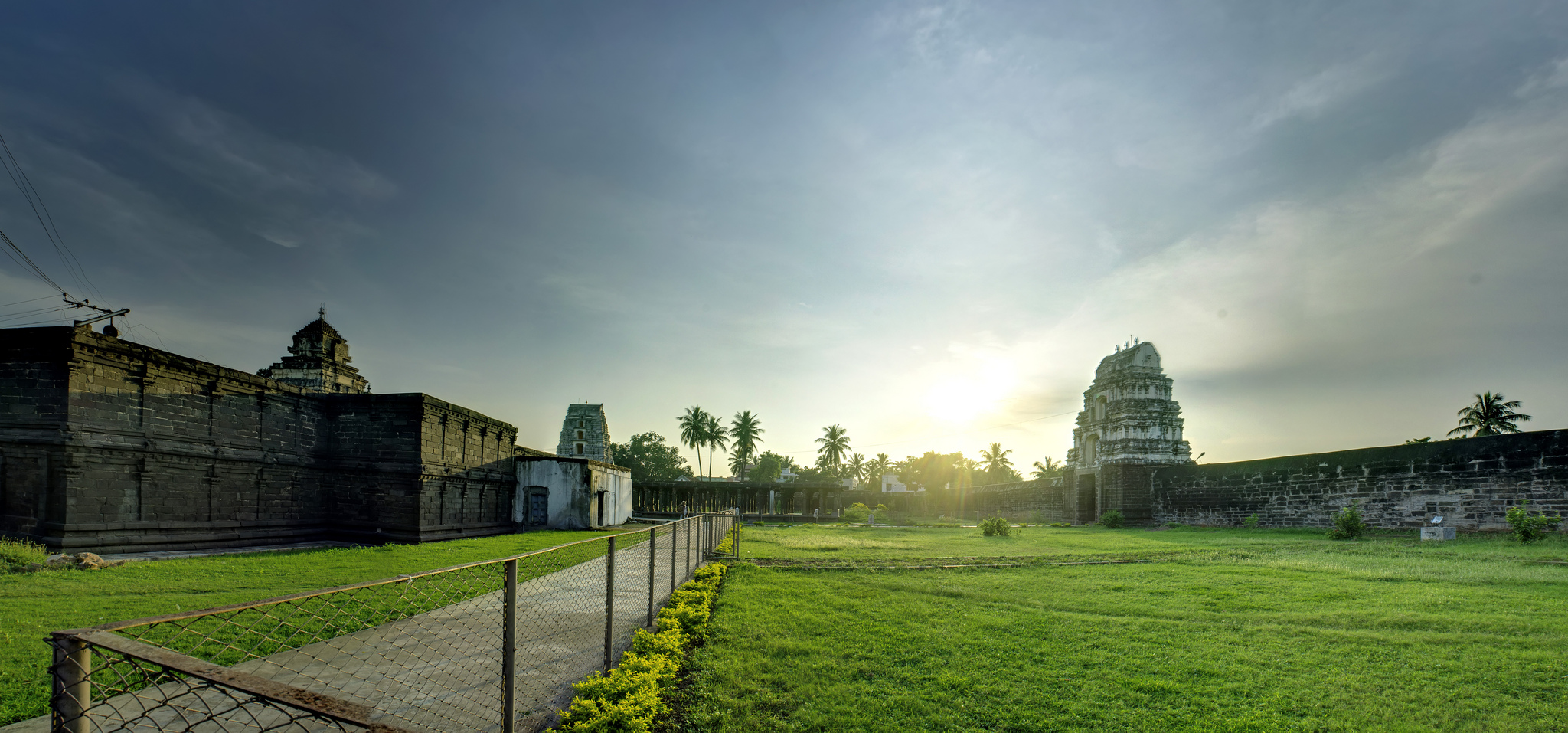
Draksharama Temple

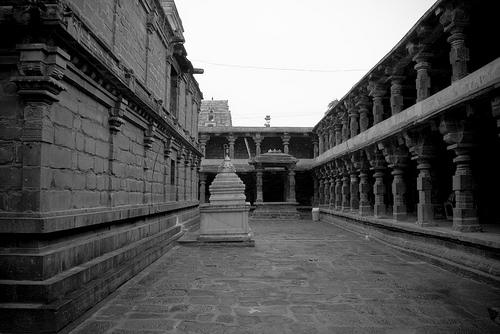
Inside view of the temple

Draksharamam is a village in Konaseema district of the Indian state of Andhra Pradesh. The Bhimeswara Swamy Temple in this town is one of the five temples of Shiva known as Pancharama Kshetras.

== Ashta Someswaras ==
Eight lingas are consecrated in eight directions (cardinal and intercardinal) of Draksharama. These temples are known as Ashta Someswaras.

== Etymology ==
This village was formerly known as Dakshatapovana and Dakshavāṭika.

== Notable residents ==
- Mallikarjuna Panditaradhyudu (a prominent 12th Century Telugu poet and among Paṇḍitatrayam of Veerasaivism)
- Malladi Venkata Satyanarayana Rao (musician and broadcaster)
- Duvvuri Subbamma (independence activist)

== See also ==
- Andhra Vishnu
- Pancharama Kshetras
