= Lakshminarasimha Temple, Haranhalli =

Lakshmi Narasimha Swamy Temple of Hāranhalli
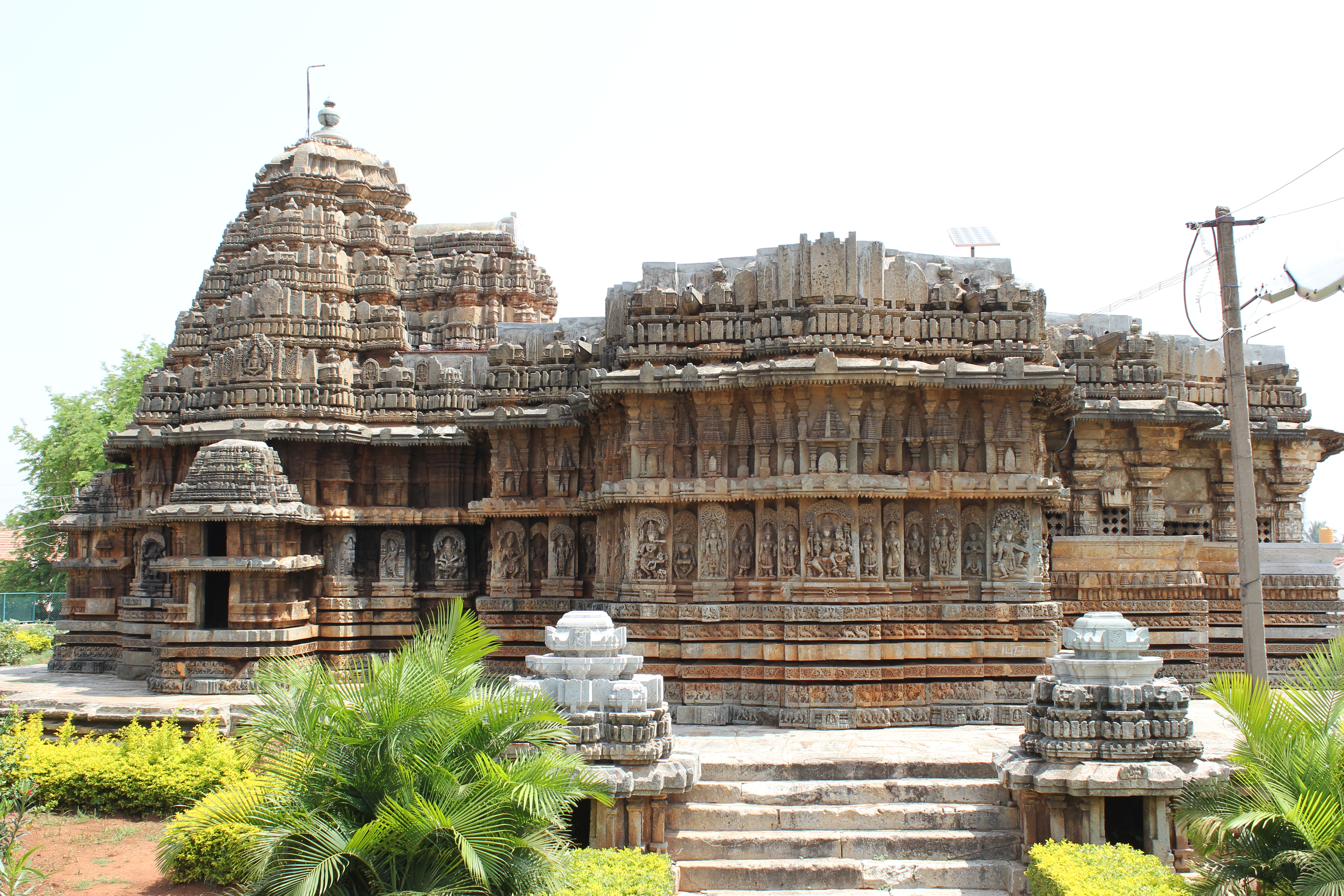

- Location within India Location within Karnataka

Religion
- Affiliation: Hinduism
- District: Hassan
- Deity: Vishnu

Location
- Location: Harnahalli
- State: Karnataka
- Country: India
- Interactive map of Lakshmi Narasimha Swamy Temple of Hāranhalli
- Coordinates: 13°14′48.2″N 76°13′26.0″E

Architecture
- Type: Hoysala
- Creator: Heggade brothers
- Completed: c. 1234 CE

The Lakshminarasimha temple at Haranhalli, sometimes referred to as Lakshmi Narasimha temple of Haranhalli, is one of two major historic Hindu temples that have survived in Haranhalli, Karnataka, India. It is triple-shrine temple dedicated to Vishnu, while the other – Someshvara Temple, Haranhalli few hundred meters to the east – is dedicated to Shiva. Both temples reflect a Vesara-style Hoysala architecture, share similar design ideas and features, and were completed in the 1230s by three wealthy brothers – Peddanna Heggade, Sovanna and Kesanna.

According to the inscriptions found near the temple and in the village, the temple was originally dedicated to and named after Kesava – also Vishnu, but over its history was renamed as the Lakshminarasimha temple. The temple is notable for its artwork and for including architectural features typically found in late Chalukya and early Hoysala periods.

The Lakshminarasimha temple is a protected monument under the Karnataka state division of the Archaeological Survey of India.

== Location and date ==
Haranhalli, – also referred to as Harnahalli, Haruvanahalli or Hiriya Somanathapura in historic inscriptions – is located about 35 kilometres (22 mi) from Halebidu and about 35 kilometres (22 mi) from Hassan city in Karnataka state, India. It is connected to India's highway network with NH 73 and SH 21. The Lakshminarasimha temple is located towards the west-center of the village, and it is about 300 meters to the west of the Somesvara temple.

== Architecture ==
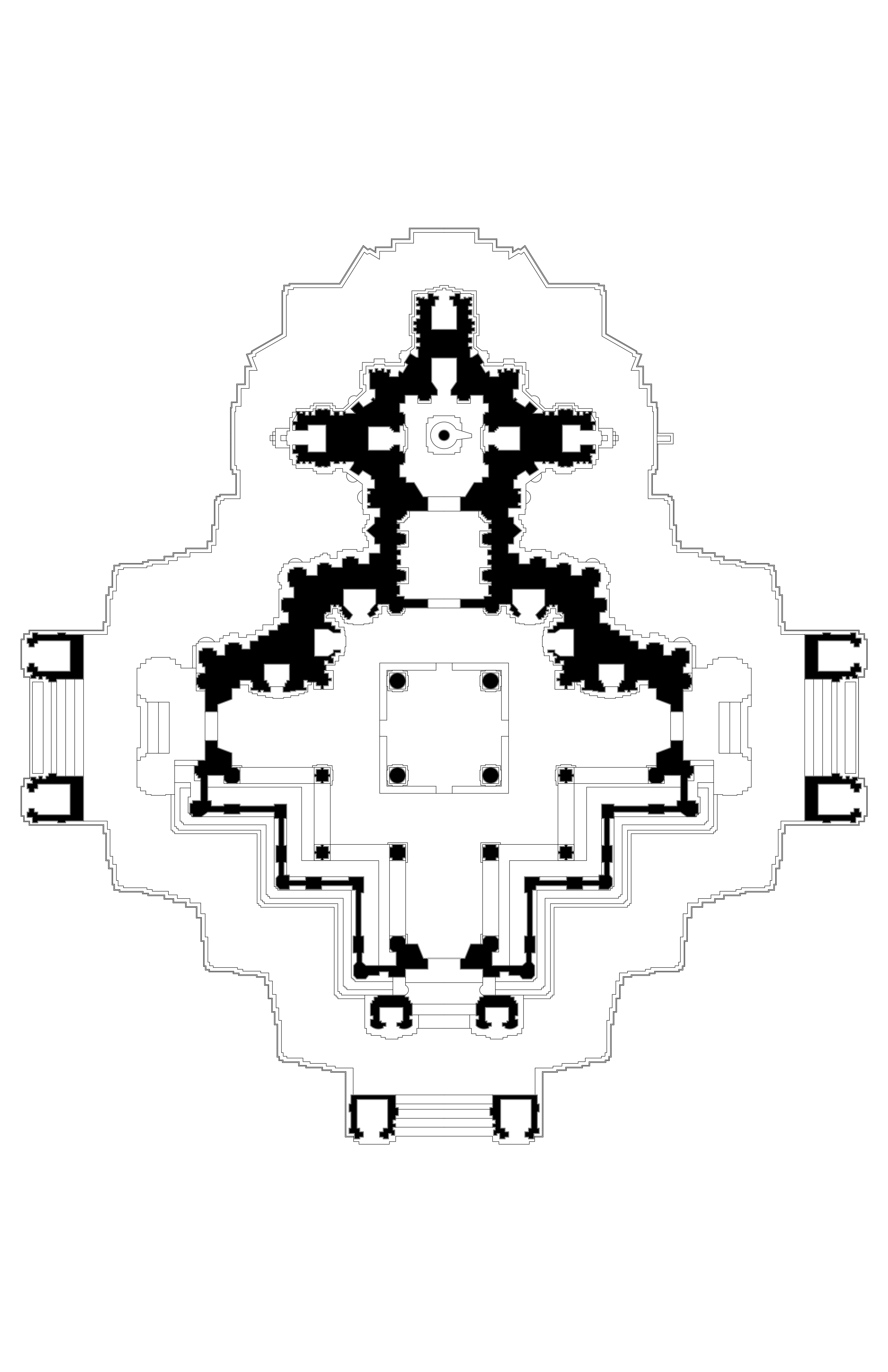
The floor plans of the Lakshmi Narasimha temple and the Somesvara temple (above) in Harnahalli are very similar. They both illustrate the three entrance square plan in historic Sanskrit texts on architecture. The Lakshmi Narasimha temple has two additional lateral shrines before the ranga-mandapa (not shown above).

The Lakshminarasimha temple at Harahalli is a trikuta (three sanctum) shrine set within a mature Vesara architecture. It has only one Vimana with superstructure, making it appear from the distance as if it has just one sanctum. It sits on a pallavi style of jagati (a molded platform constructed per vastu guidelines). This platform, in addition to adding visual beauty, provides the devotees a path for circumambulation (pradakshinapatha) around the temple. The platform has three flights of steps, one leading to the entrance to the hall and the other two that lead only up to the platform, further enhancing the visual appearance.

The upper space and structure is set in three storied bhadravalokanas, a variant of the style seen in Hoysalesvara temple in Halebidu. The temple has a gudha-mandapa that starts after the kapili, then the two side shrines, followed by the ranga-mandapa. Outside on the walls are panels of Hindu deity-related panels at the talajangha, in turreted niches. These are mainly from the Vaishnava pantheon.

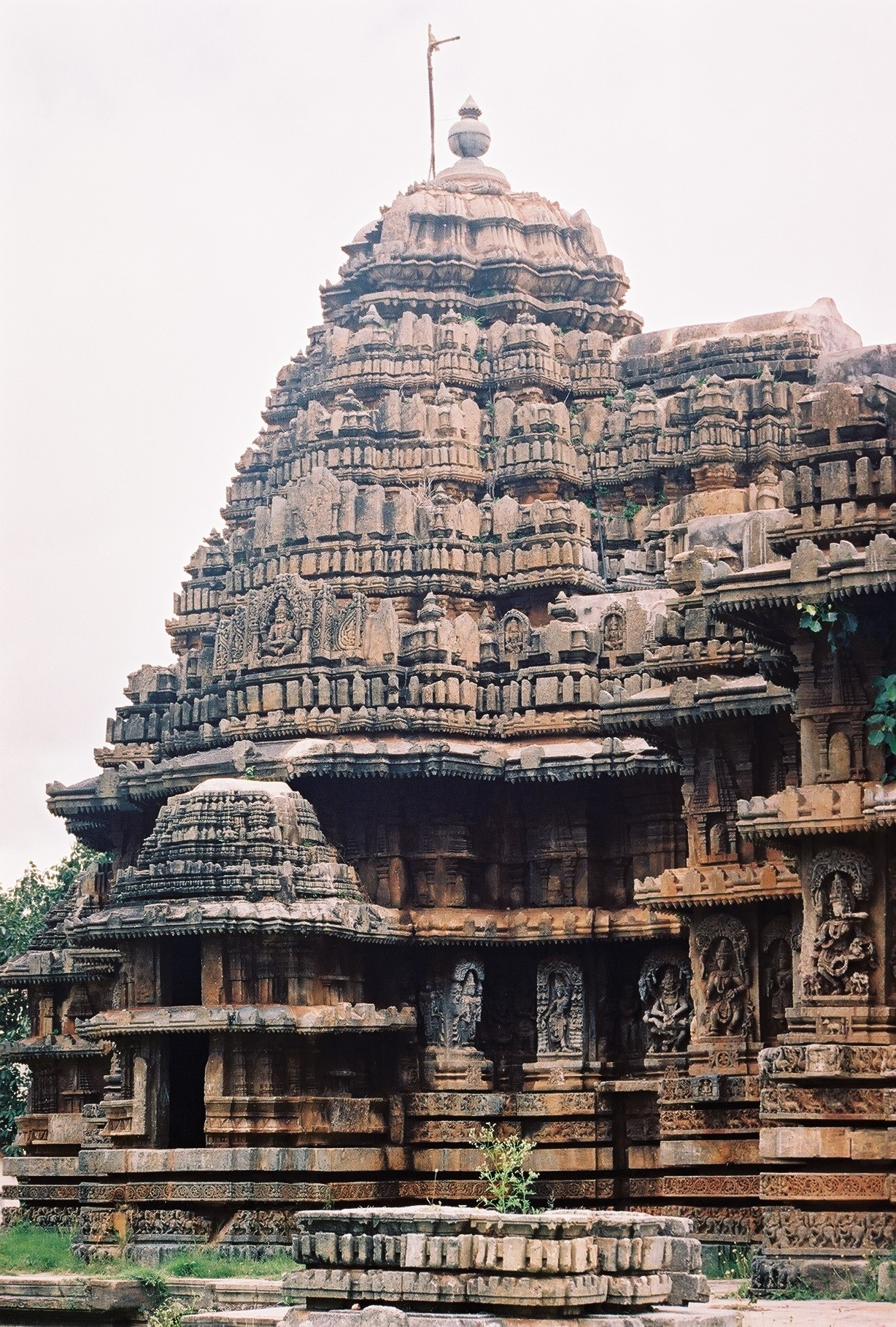
Profile of shrine and tower at Lakshminarasimha Temple in Haranhalli

The Lakshminarasimha temple plan is similar to that found in the temples at Hosaholalu, Nuggihalli and Javagallu. While its decorative ornamentation is simpler, it has a more original look. The temple plan is that of a trikuta (three shrined), with a strong focus on the middle shrine which has a superstructure (tower or shikhara) and a sukhanasi (nose or tower over the vestibule).

The three shrines are connected by a common hall (mantapa). The lateral shrines are connected directly to the hall while the middle shrine has a vestibule that connects the sanctum (cella or vimana) to the hall. Since the lateral shrines do not have a tower and are directly connected to the hall (without a vestibule and its corresponding tower like projection), they do not appear like shrines at all from the outside but rather as a part of the hall. The central shrine on the contrary is highly visible because of its tower, and the sukhanasi that projects prominently from the tower.

=== Decoration and sculptures ===
The sanctum of the three shrines contain an image of the Hindu god Vishnu; Venugopala, Keshava and Lakshminarasimha. The towers over the central shrine and its vestibule (sukhanasi or nose) are intact and intricate. The kalasa on top of the tower (the decorative water-pot at the apex of the tower) is however missing. Since the lateral shrines have no towers, their superstructure comprises a stylish row of miniature roofs above the upper eaves.

The decorative plan of the walls of the shrines and the hall reflects the Hoysala style (with two eaves that run around the temple). The first heavy eaves runs below the superstructure and all around the temple with a projection of about half a meter. The second eaves runs around the temple about a meter below the first. In between the two eaves are the miniature decorative towers (Aedicula) on pilasters. Below the second eaves are the wall panels of Hindu artwork and reliefs. Below this band, at the base are the six equal width rectangular moldings (frieze). Starting from the top, the friezes depict; hansa (birds) in the first frieze, makara (mythical fused animals) in the second, the usual depiction of scenes from the Hindu epics are absent in the third frieze which has been left blank. This is followed by leafy scrolls in the fourth frieze. The fifth and sixth friezes exhibit high quality workmanship in depicting horses and elephants respectively.

== Gallery ==
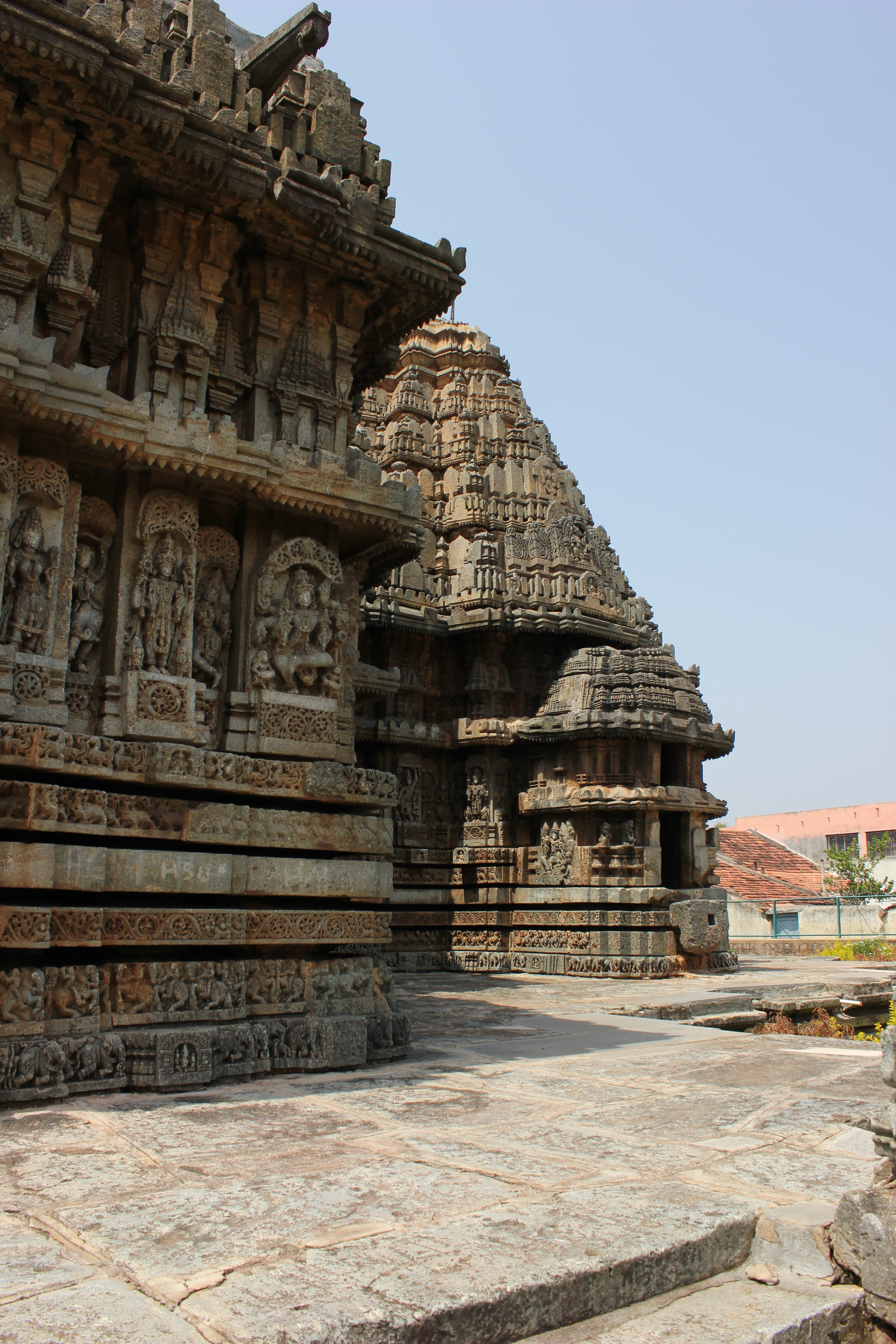
The mantapa outer wall, and vimana

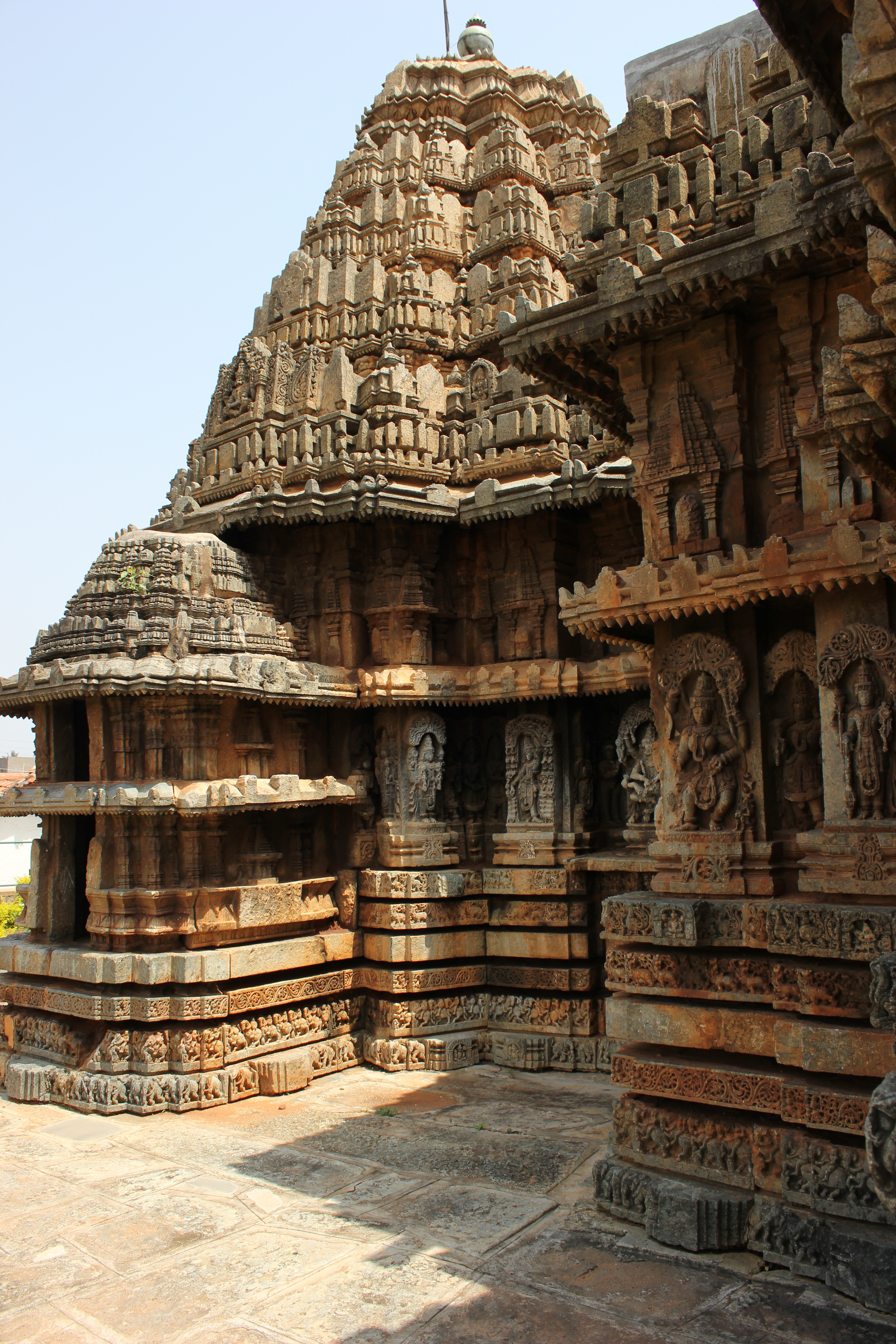
Close up of Vimana and the aedicula

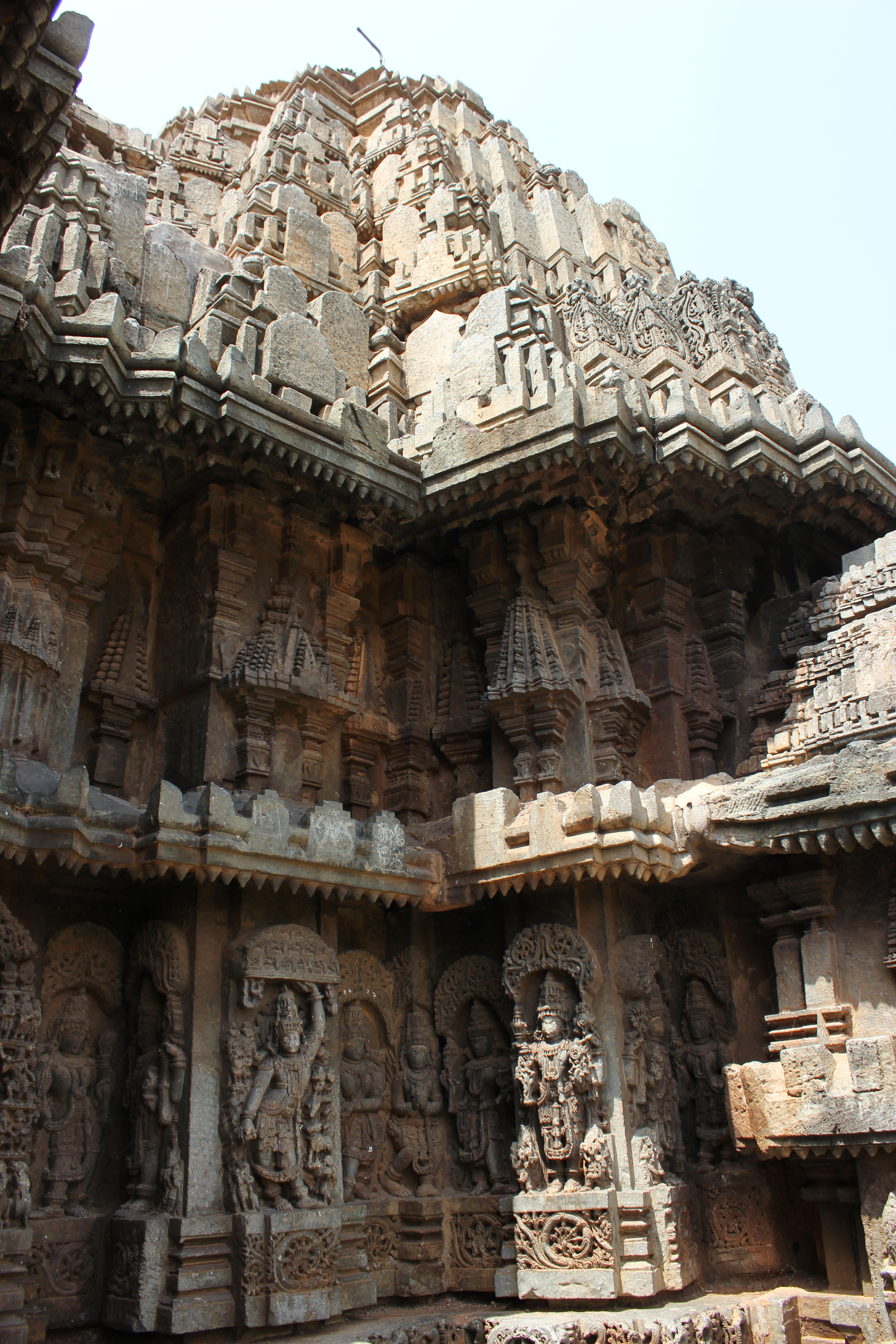
Close up of shikhara (superstructure)

Lathe turned pillars, decorative door jamb and lintel

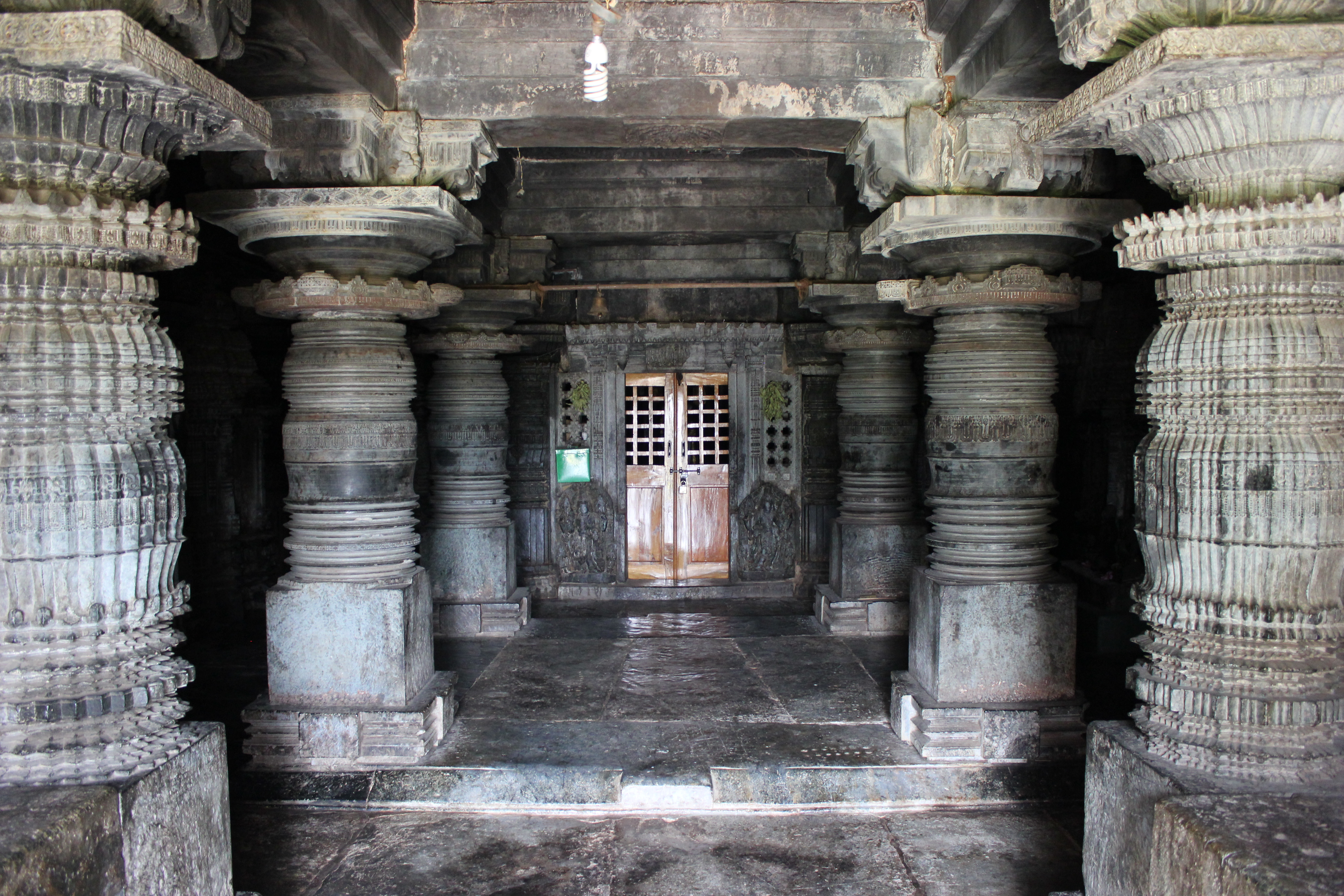
Closed mantapa facing a sanctum

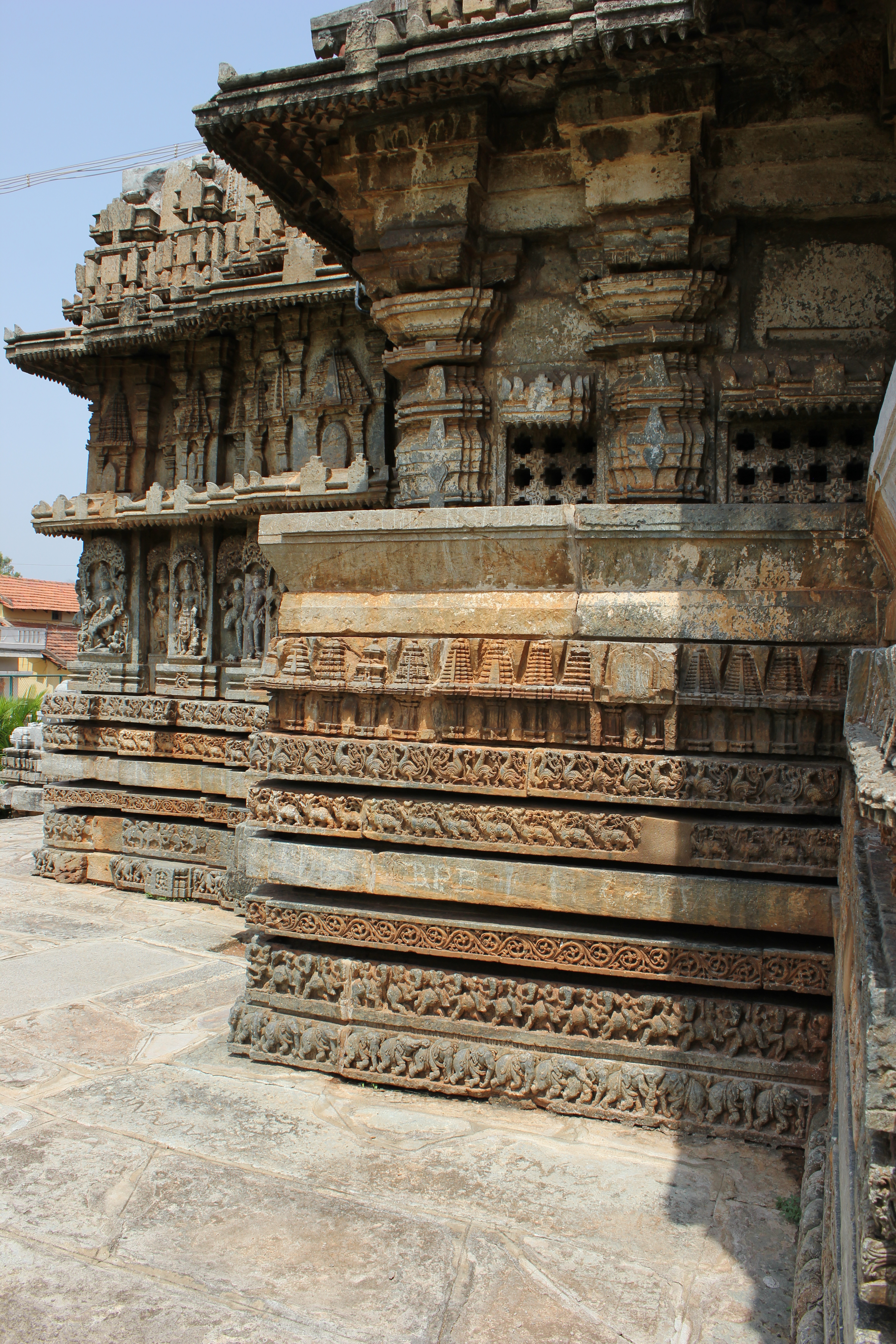
Outer wall articulation and horizontal frieze treatment

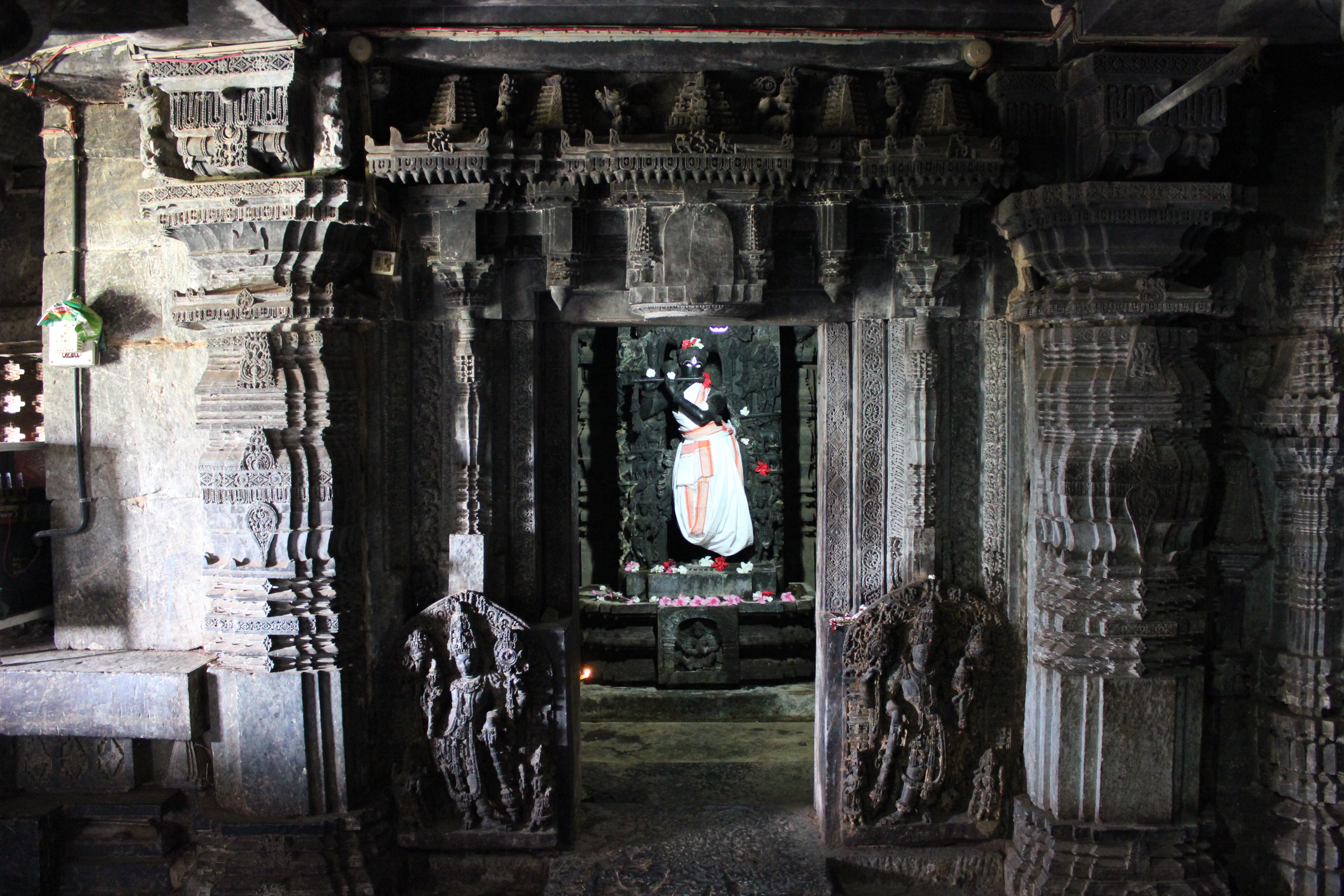
Decorative door jamb and lintel at entrance to sanctum

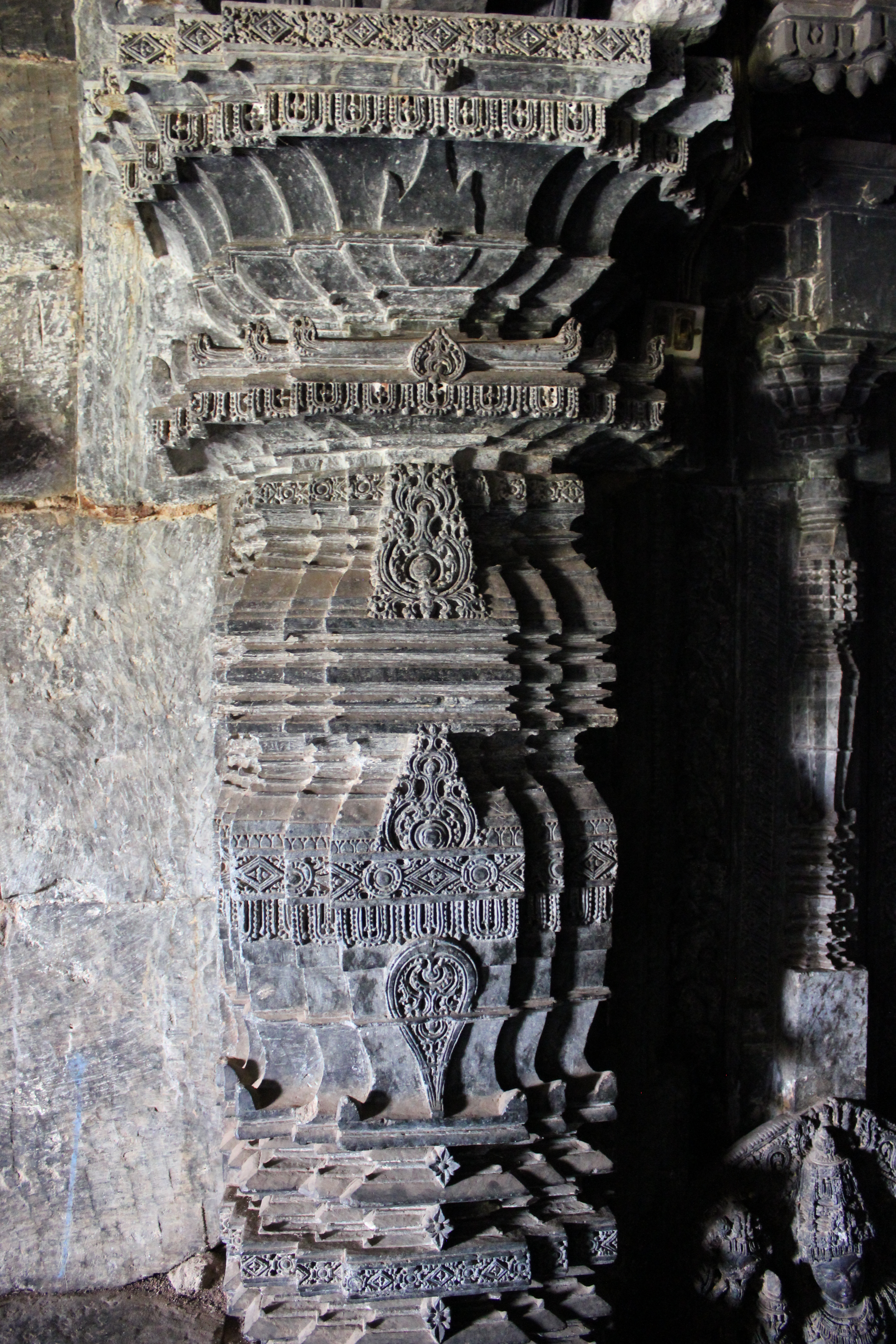
Deorative pilaster

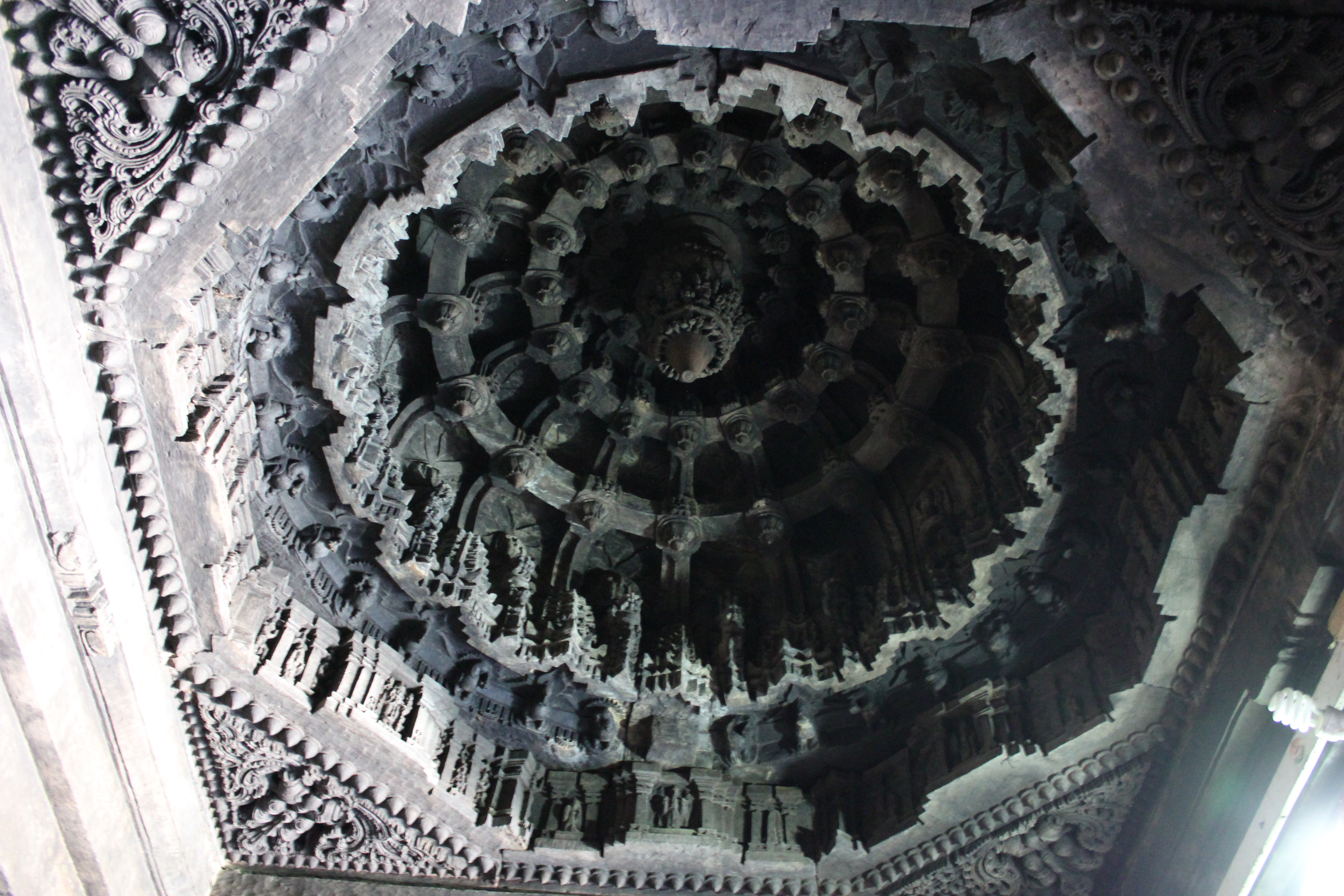
Domical ceiling in the closed mantapa

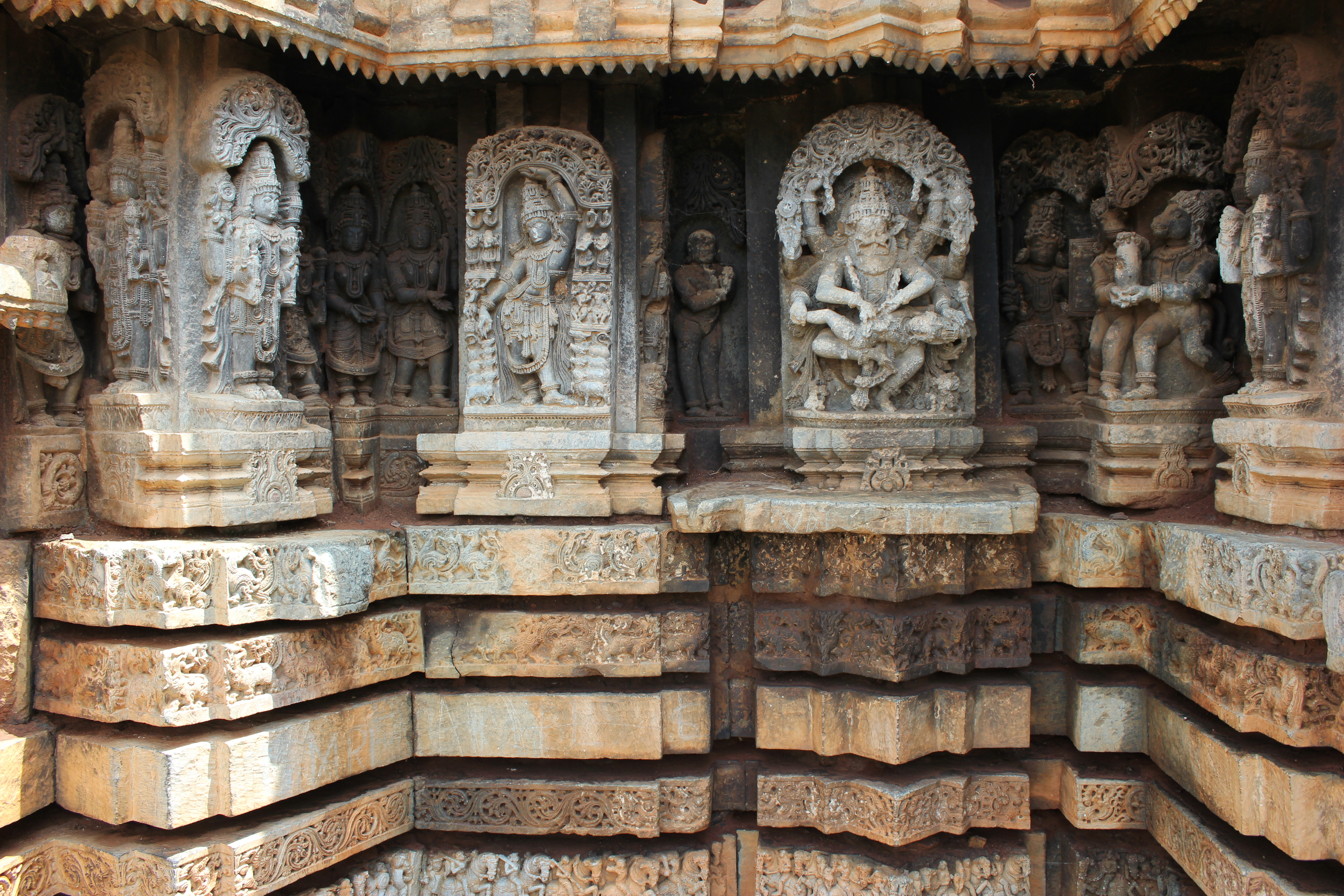
Horizontal frieze treatment to moldings

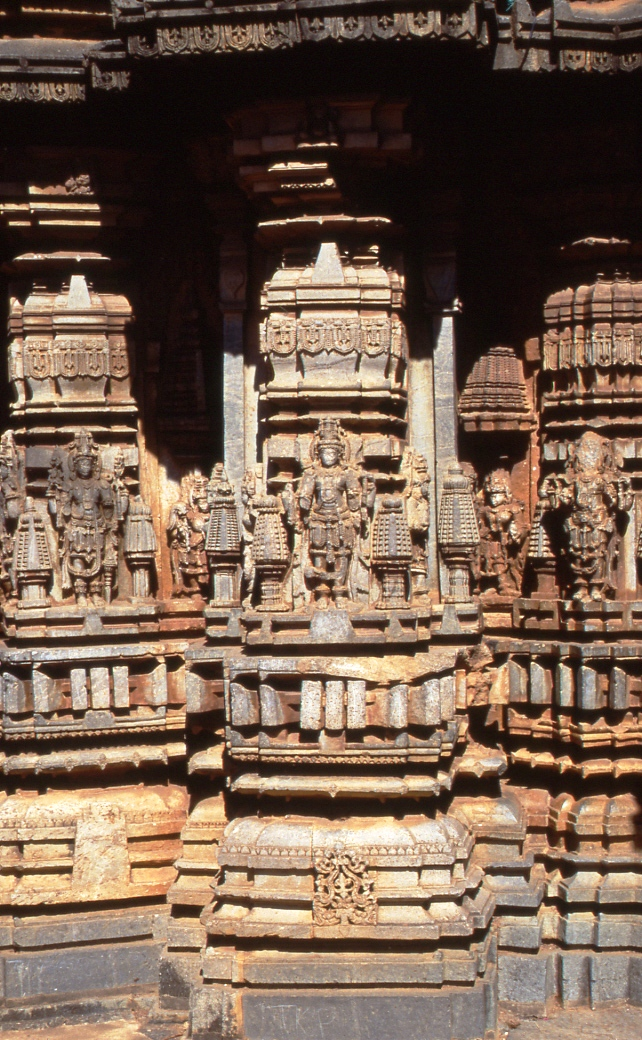
Shrine outer wall relief and molding

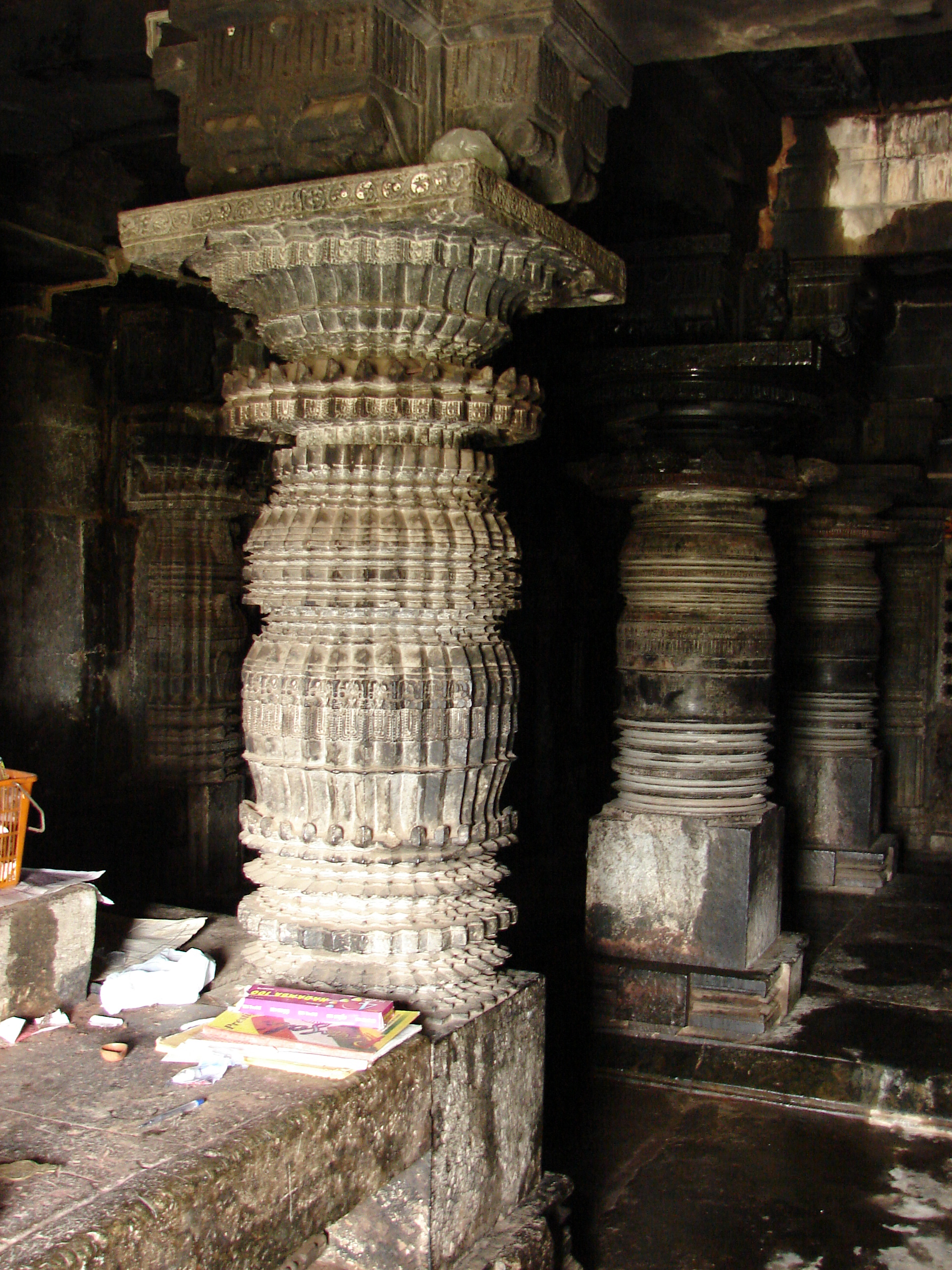
Ornate pillars inside mantapa
