= Someswaram =

- village
- Interactive map of Someswaram
- Location in Andhra Pradesh, India Someswaram (India)
- Coordinates: 16.864°N 81.990°E
- Country: India
- State: Andhra Pradesh
- District: East Godavari
- Mandal: Rayavaram

Population (2001)
  - Total: 1,059

Languages
  - Official: Telugu
- Time zone: UTC+5:30 (IST)
- PIN: 533261

Someswaram is a village in Rayavaram mandal, East Godavari District of Andhra Pradesh, India. Is there Someswara Swamy temple Lord siva is one of the astha(8) Soma lingas in Drakasharama.

== Demographics ==
The total population of Someswaram is 8,715, including 4,408 males and 4,307 females living in 2,230 houses. The total area of Someswaram is 799 hectares.
