= Malladi Venkata Satyanarayana Rao =

Indian musician (1932–1996)

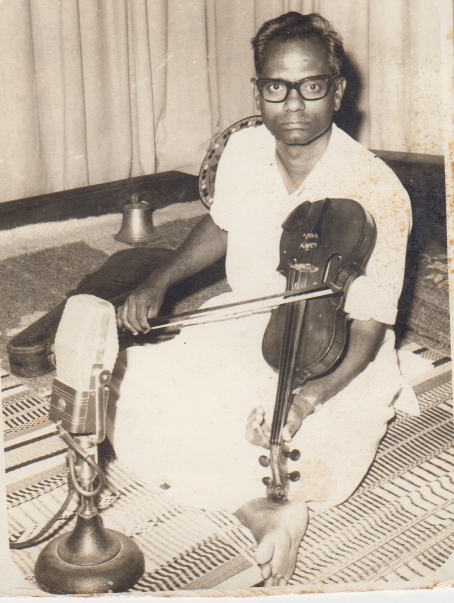
Malladi Venkata Satyanarayana Rao in 1980

Malladi Venkata Satyanarayana Rao (మల్లాది వెంకట సత్యనారాయణ రావు) (6 May 1932 – 1 November 1996) was a violinist and radio artist, honoured with the title Sangeetha Kalanidhi.

== Biography ==
He was born at Draksharama, near Kakinada, to Malladi Satyanarayana Murthy and Suryakantham. He has three younger brothers and two younger sisters. He pursued music and completed his early school days in Mandapeta. He also learnt Nadaswaram from a snake charmer while learning the basics of violin. He joined in Maharajah's Government College of Music and Dance at for violin diploma. After completing the course, he settled in Kakinada as a violin artist. He made hundreds of people to learn music. He acted as a joint secretary for "Sangeetha Vidwathsabha" and "SreeRama Samajam". He gave violin assistance for vocal concerts and many Harikatha performances.

He retired as music lecturer in Kakinada Zilla Parishad High School after years of service. He was an expert in both playing violin and also in vocal. He did violin co-ordination for vocal concerts, many Harikatha eves and solo concerts. At the same time he given special concerts about "Parvathi Kalyanam", "Rukmini Kalyanam". He acted as an instructor for teacher's training certificate course.

He was an expert in playing nadaswaram. In kakinada, Barampuram, Amalaapuram and other places, he played nagaswaram as their wish. While the performance, snakes came to concert and did dance for his performance. It became a mesmerizing moment for live viewers and they enjoyed the real power of music.

The cultural association Kakinada Bhajana Samaajam conducted Harikathaa Mahotsvas in December 1968 at Venugopala Swamy Temple. In that function, for the wish of audience he played 'Nagaswaram'. At that time, two snakes came to that concert and danced to his music. He consoled the audience for the fear of snakes entering into human places. By completing his play of Nagaswaram, snakes were gone unknowingly. His wife, Mrs. Subbalakshmi told, some audience have decided to honour Malladi Venkata Satyanarayana Rao with "Suvarna Simha Thalaatam" for his memorizing Nagaswaram performance. Kakinada Municipal Chairman Puttaa Venkata Ramana Murty acted as president for that function.

In 1952–65, he performed a famous drama "Vikranthi" directed by Rao Gopala Rao. He has also worked as "Music Director" for it. Malladi given violin co-ordination for the Harikathas of Rao Kamala Kumari (wife of Rao Gopala Rao).

Malladi Venkata Satyanarayana Rao helped Students of Kapileswaram Harikatha Patasala to perform Harikatha events. He honoured by many titles such as 'Sangeetha Kalanidhi', 'madhura gaayaka', 'Gaanakalaa saraswathi' are some of them. He travelled throughout Andhra Pradesh and given his mesmerising performance on their request. He given his service to Annavaram Veera Venkata Satyanarana Swamy Temple yearly Celebrations of "Kalyana Mahotsavaalu".

He died on 1 November 1996, because of a heart attack. He has three children. Elder son Malladi Satyanarayana Murthy working as lecturer, 2nd son Malladi Subbarao working as Engineer and third son Malladi Kameswara Rao working as journalist.
