= Haranhalli =

Haranahalli
- village
- Location in Karnataka, India Haranahalli (India)
- Coordinates: 13°14′N 76°13′E
- Country: India
- State: Karnataka
- District: Hassan
- Talukas: Arsikere

Population (2001)
  - Total: 5,658

Languages
  - Official: Kannada
- Time zone: UTC+5:30 (IST)

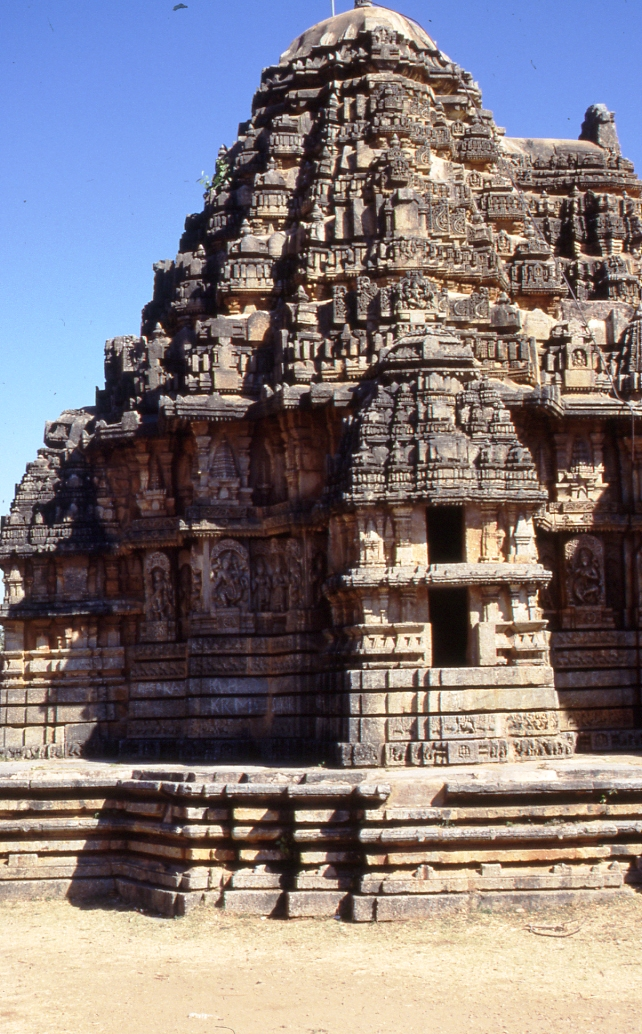
Someshwara Temple, Haranhalli, Arsikere, Karnataka, India

Haranahalli is a village in the southern state of Karnataka, India. It is located in the Arsikere taluk of Hassan district in Karnataka. Haranhalli is well known for two ornate temples built by the Hoysala Empire King Vira Narasimha II in 1235 A.D., the Lakshminarasimha temple and the Sadashiva temple.

== Demographics ==
As of 2001 India census, Haranahalli had a population of 5658 with 2977 males and 2681 females.

== See also ==
- Hassan
- Districts of Karnataka
