= Someshvara Temple, Haranhalli =

Somesvara Temple of Haranhalli
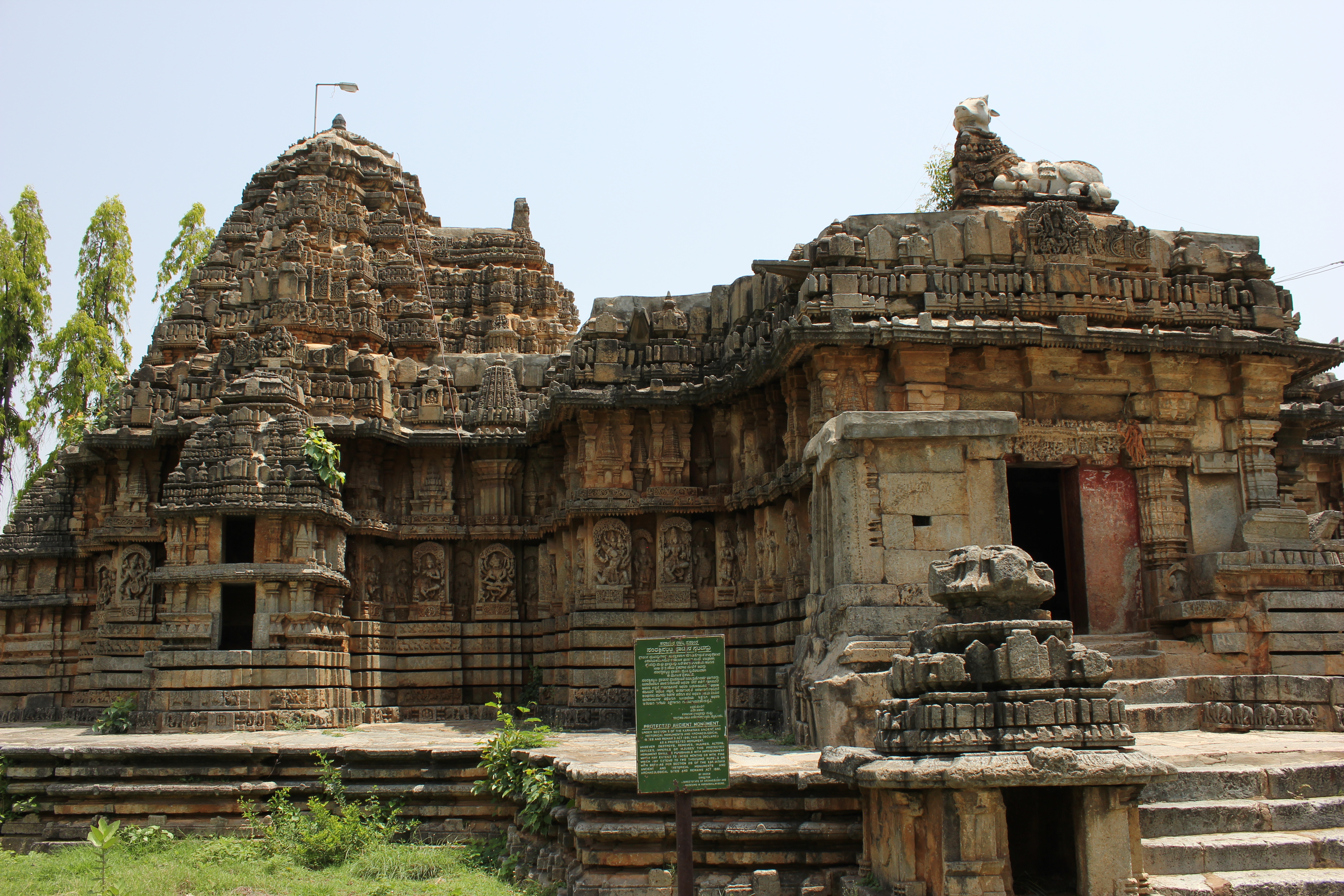

- Location within India Location within Karnataka

Religion
- Affiliation: Hinduism
- District: Hassan
- Deity: Shiva

Location
- Location: Harnahalli
- State: Karnataka
- Country: India
- Interactive map of Somesvara Temple of Haranhalli
- Coordinates: 13°14′50.8″N 76°13′34.5″E

Architecture
- Type: Hoysala
- Creator: Heggade brothers
- Completed: c. 1234 CE

The Someshvara temple at Haranhalli, sometimes referred to as Somesvara temple of Hāranhalli, is one of two major historic Hindu temples that have survived in Haranhalli, Karnataka, India. It is dedicated to Shiva, while the other – Lakshminarasimha Temple, Haranhalli few hundred meters to the west – is dedicated to Vishnu. Both temples reflect a Vesara-style Hoysala architecture, share similar design ideas and features, and were completed in the 1230s by three wealthy brothers – Peddanna Heggade, Sovanna and Kesanna.

The Someshvara temple is more damaged and ruined than the nearby Lakshminarasimha, but its surviving art and panels from Shaivism, Vaishnavism and Shaktism are notable. Also notable is its illustration of three entrance-style, square plan Vesara architecture with an integrated circumambulation path on the jagati.

The Someshvara temple is a protected monument under the Karnataka state division of the Archaeological Survey of India.

== Location and date ==
Haranhalli, – also referred to as Harnahalli, Haruvanahalli or Hiriya Somanathapura in historic inscriptions – is located about 35 kilometres (22 mi) east of Halebidu and about 35 kilometres (22 mi) northeast of Hassan city in Karnataka state, India. It is connected to India's highway network with NH 73 and SH 21. The Somesvara temple is located towards the eastern edge of the village, and it is about 300 meters to the east of the more ornate Lakshminarasimha temple.

== Architecture ==
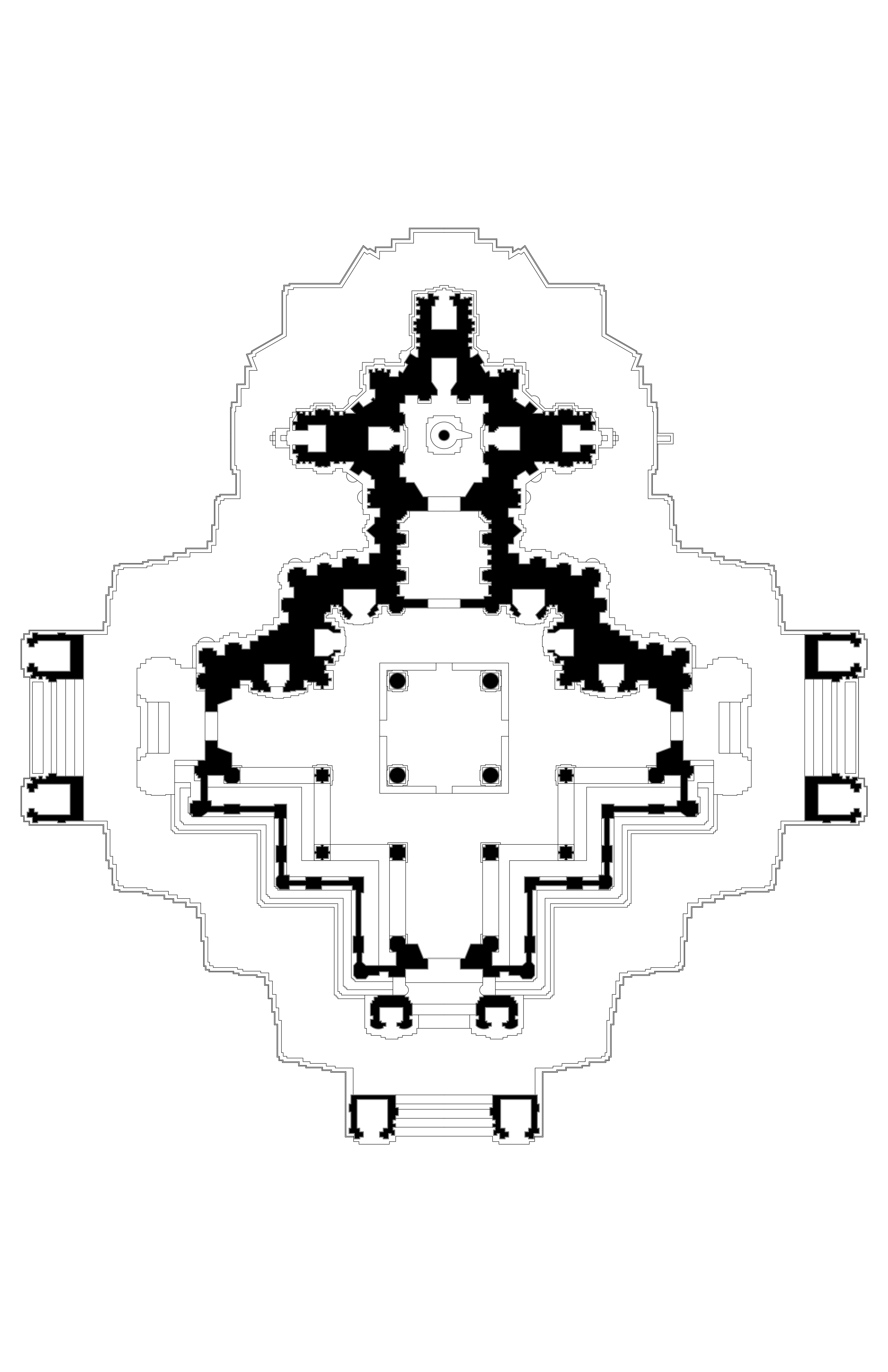
The floor plan of the Somesvara temple at Harnahalli.

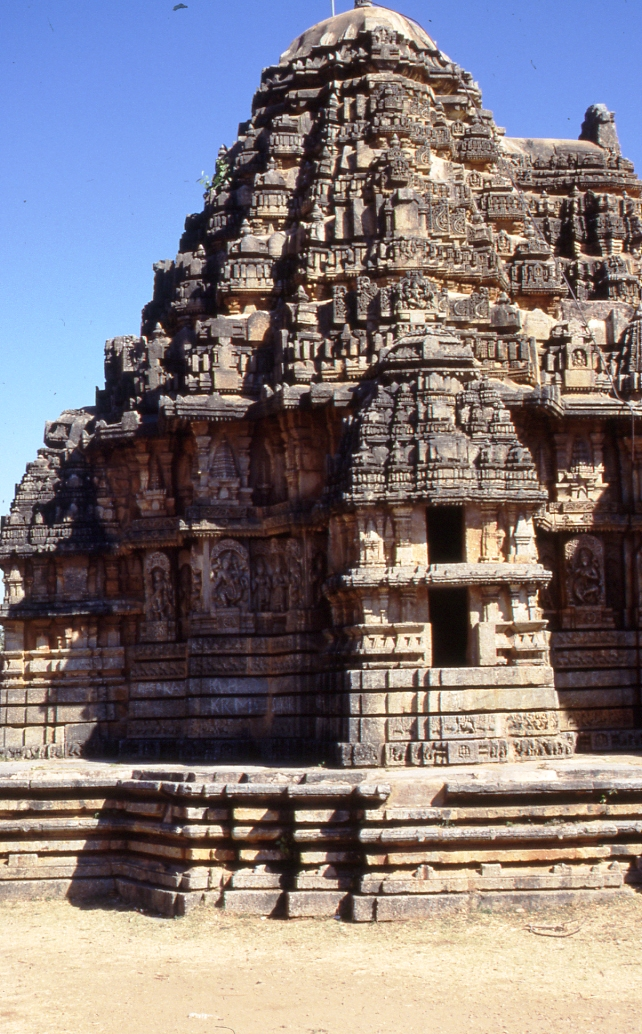
The Vesara tower of the Someshvara temple at Haranahalli

The Somesvara temple at Harahalli is a mature Vesara architecture. It has only one sanctum and vimana with superstructure. Like the Lakshminarasimha temple nearby that also completed in 1234 CE, this temple sits on a pallavi style of jagati (a molded platform constructed per vastu guidelines). This platform, in addition to adding visual beauty, provides the devotees a path for circumambulation (pradakshinapatha) around the temple. The platform has three flights of steps, one leading to the entrance to the hall and the other two that lead only up to the platform, further enhancing the visual appearance.

The temple plan is similar to that of the Lakshminarasimha temple, but according to art historian Foekema, the overall decorative ornamentation of Somesvara temple is somewhat lesser in quality though there are some well executed reliefs. The temple plan is a ekakuta (single shrine) but made to look like a trikuta (three shrined) due to the two simple lateral shrine like structures. The main shrine is stellate (star-shaped), has a complete superstructure (tower or shikhara) and a sukhanasi (nose or tower over the vestibule) which is similar to that in the Lakshminarasimha temple.

According to Foekema, the decoration in the interior of the Somevara temple and the upper parts of the walls deserve special mention for its taste.

=== Decoration and sculptures ===
The tower over the shrine and its vestibule (sukhanasi or nose) are intact. The kalasa on top of the tower (the decorative water-pot at the apex of the tower) is however missing. The decorative plan of the walls of the shrines and the hall reflects the mature Hoysala style with two eaves that run around the temple.

The first heavy eaves runs below the superstructure and all around the temple with a projection of about half a meter. The second eaves runs around the temple about a meter below the first. In between the two eaves are the miniature decorative towers (Aedicula) on pilasters. Below the second eaves are the wall panel of images of Hindu deities and their attendants in relief. Below this, at the base are the six equal width rectangular moldings (frieze). Starting from the top, the friezes depict; hansa (birds) in the first frieze, makara (mythical fused creatures) in the second, the usual depiction of scenes from the Hindu epics are absent in the third frieze which has been left blank. This is followed by leafy scrolls in the fourth frieze. The fifth and sixth friezes exhibit high quality workmanship in depicting horses and elephants respectively.

Many blocks of the superstructure have no carvings. Similarly, the frieze work on the moldings at the base is missing.

== Gallery ==
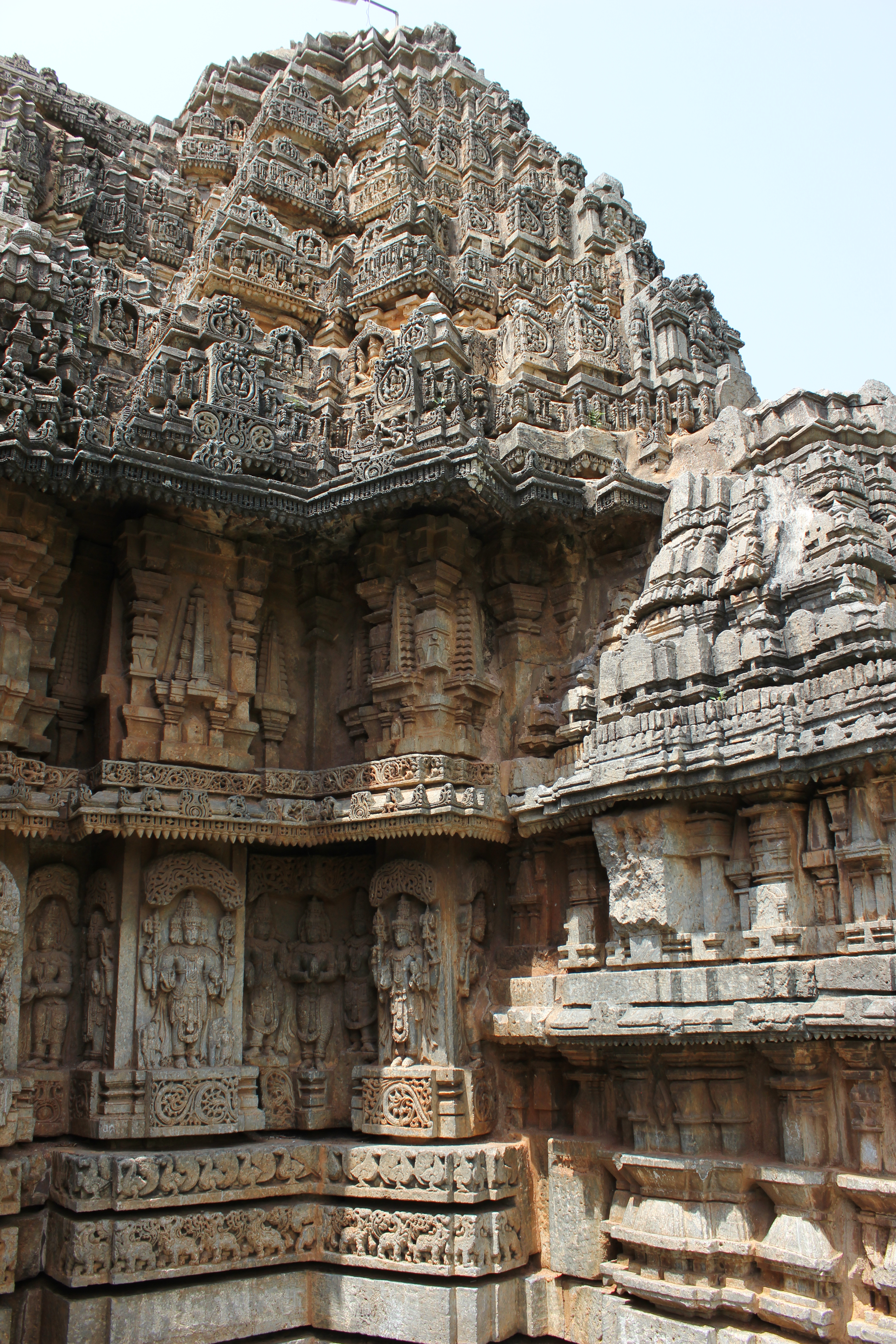
Close up of shikhara (superstructure)

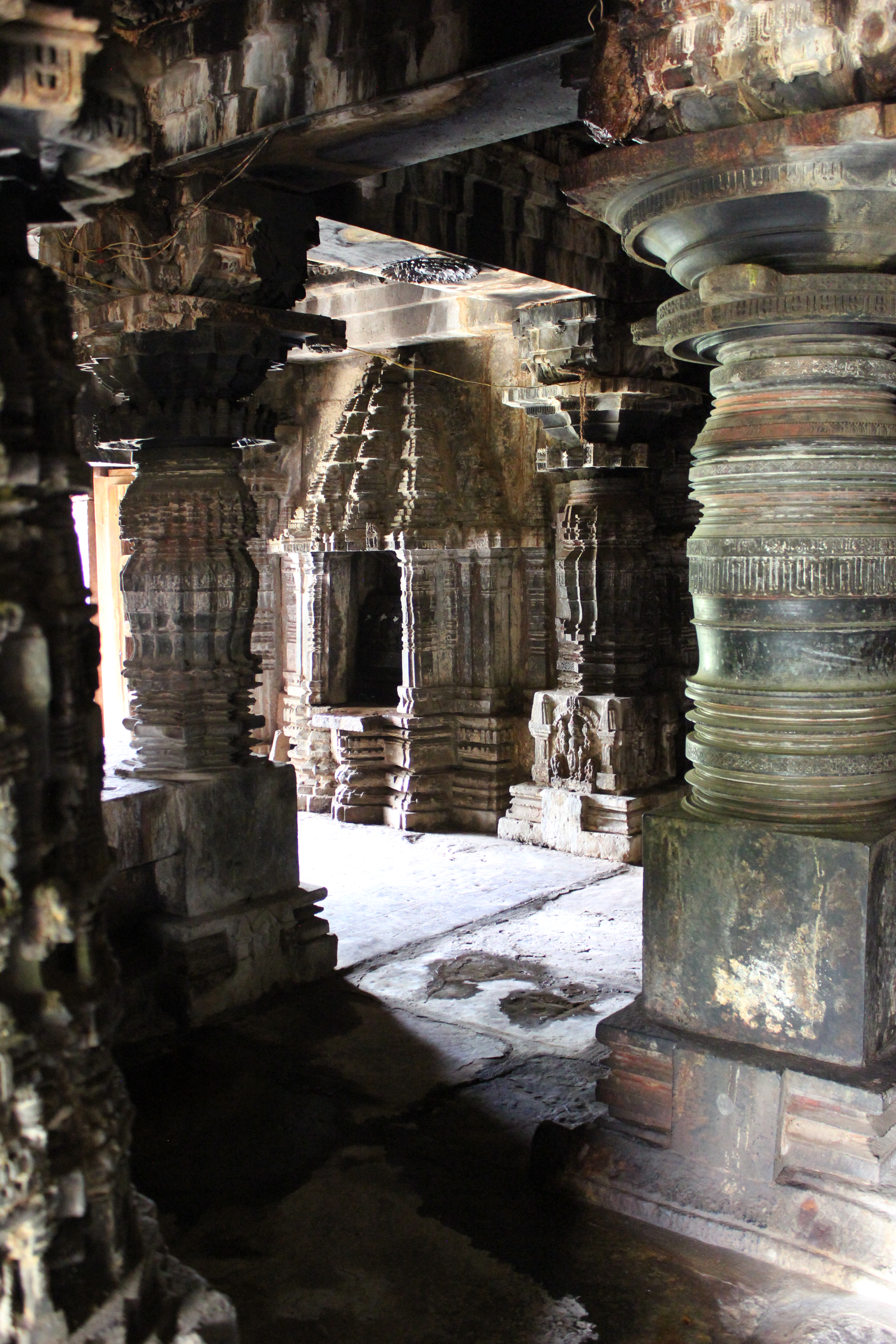
Decorative pillars and minor shrine (aedicula) inside mantapa

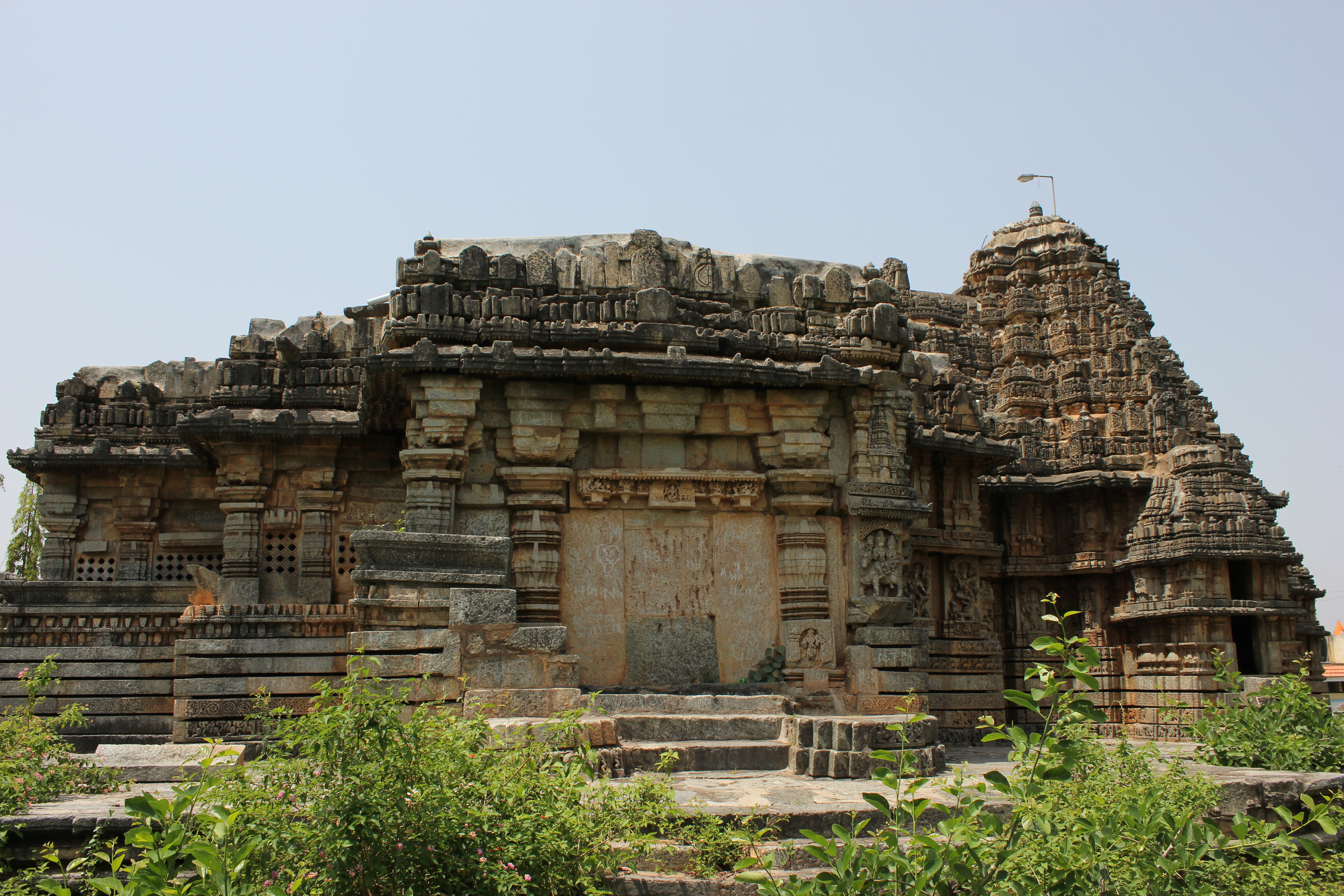
Another view of Someshvara temple at Haranahalli where mantapa entrance has been closed

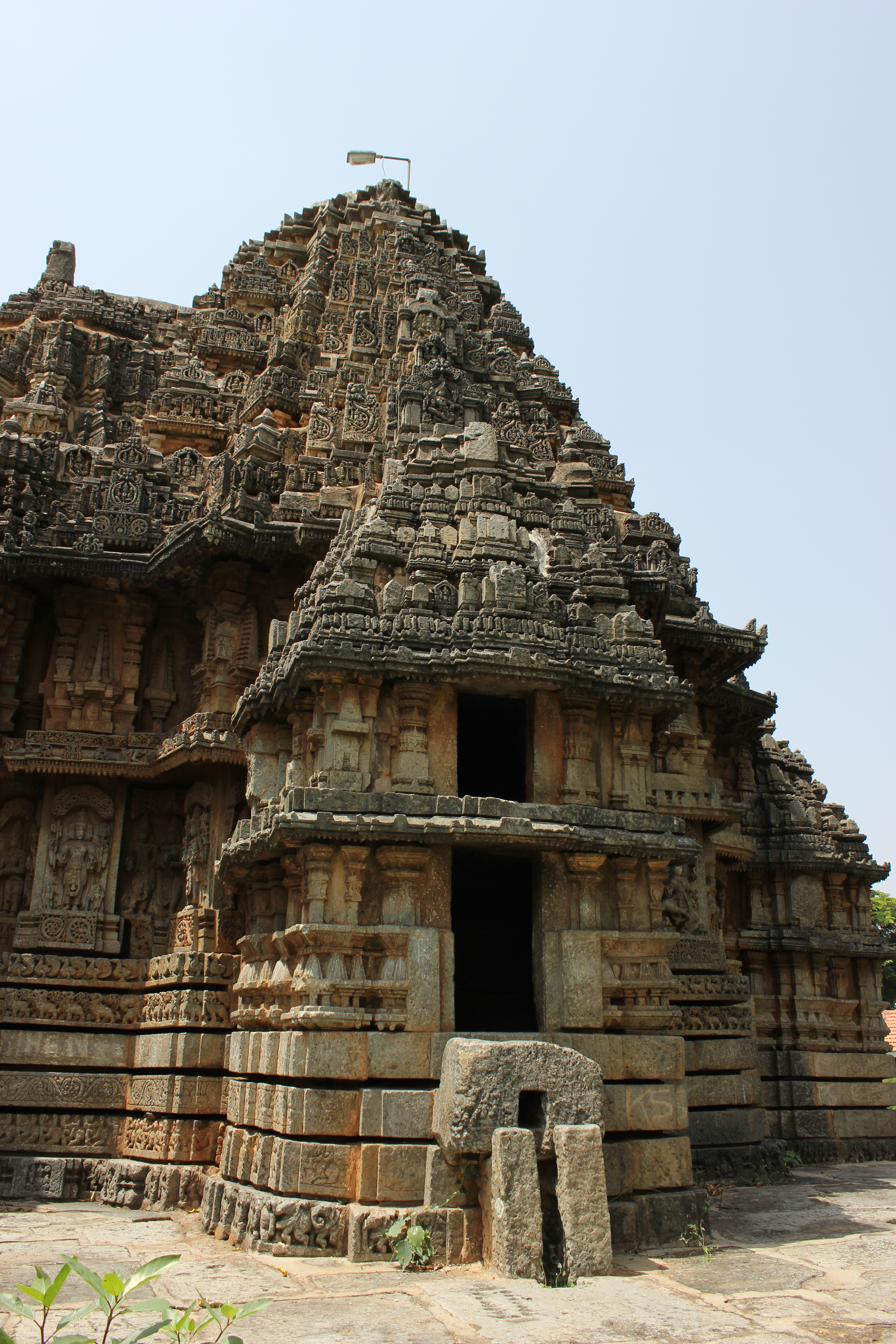
Front view of vesara tower over shrine with minor shrine extension on outer wall in the Someshvara temple at Haranahalli

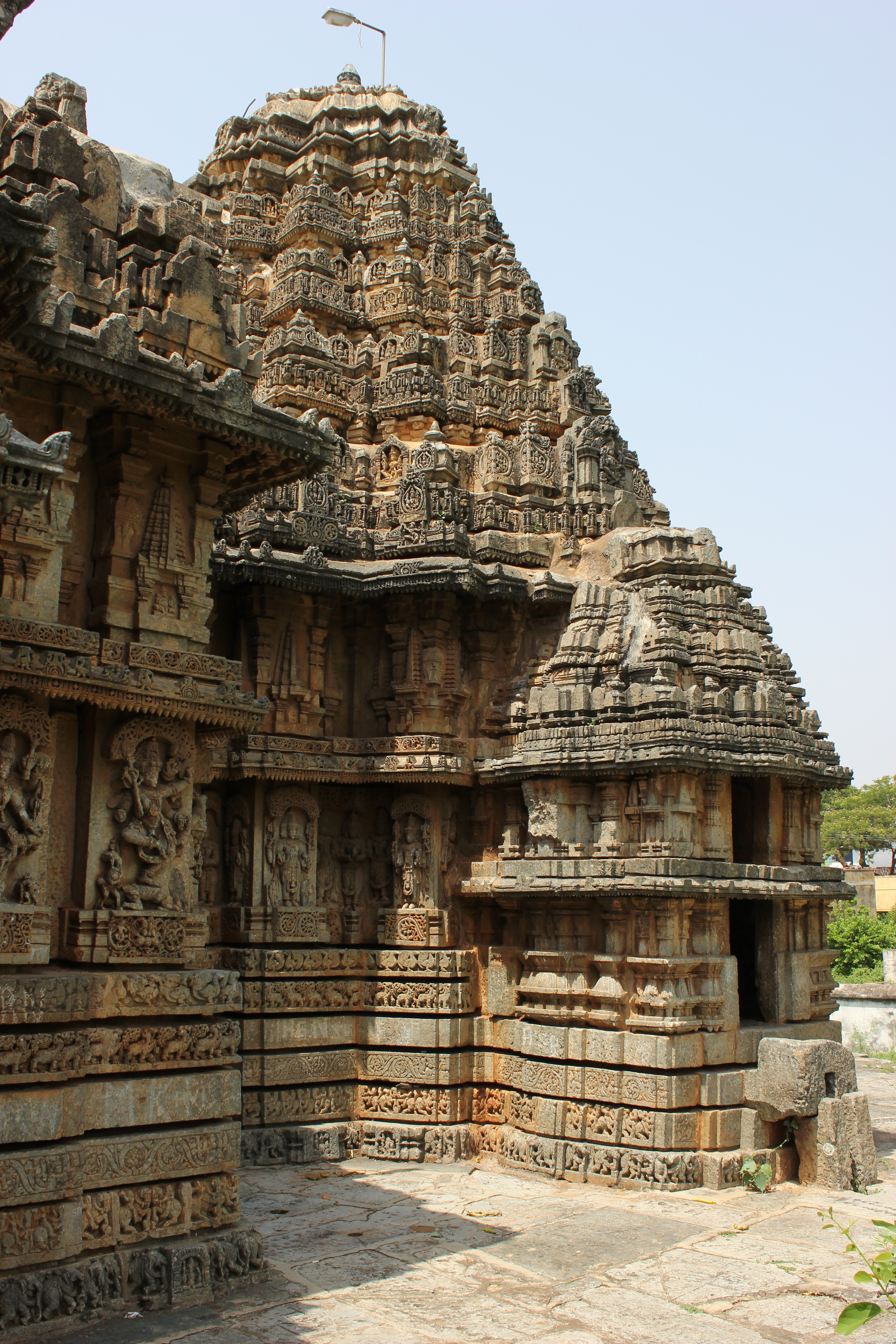
Vimana (tower and shrine) outer wall with protruding over wall aedicula (minor shrine) of Someshvara temple, Haranhalli

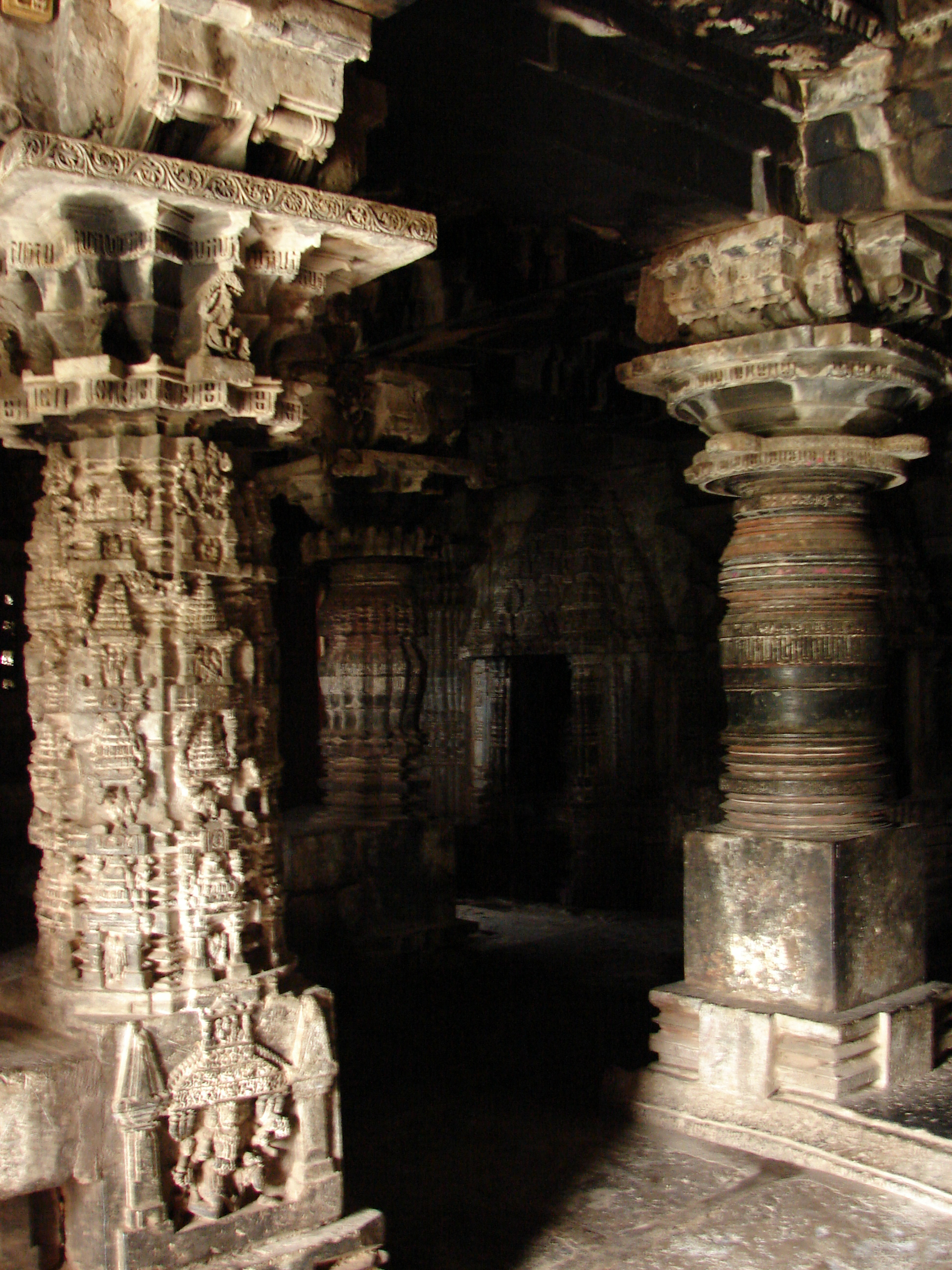
Ornate pillars inside mantapa of Someshvara temple at Haranhalli

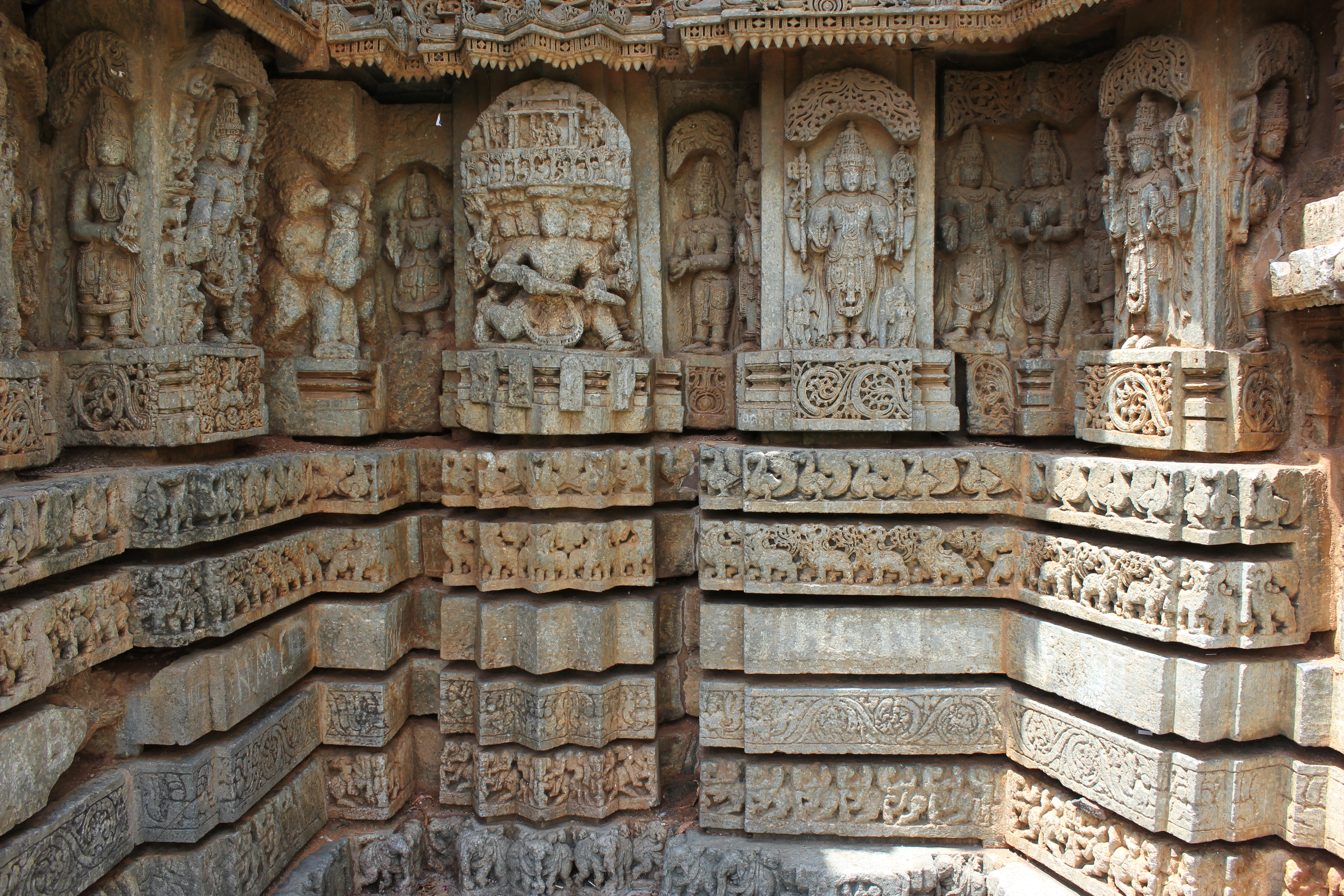
Horizontal frieze treatment in the Someshvara temple at Haranahalli with. Relief of Hindu deities in frieze on the third molding is absent.

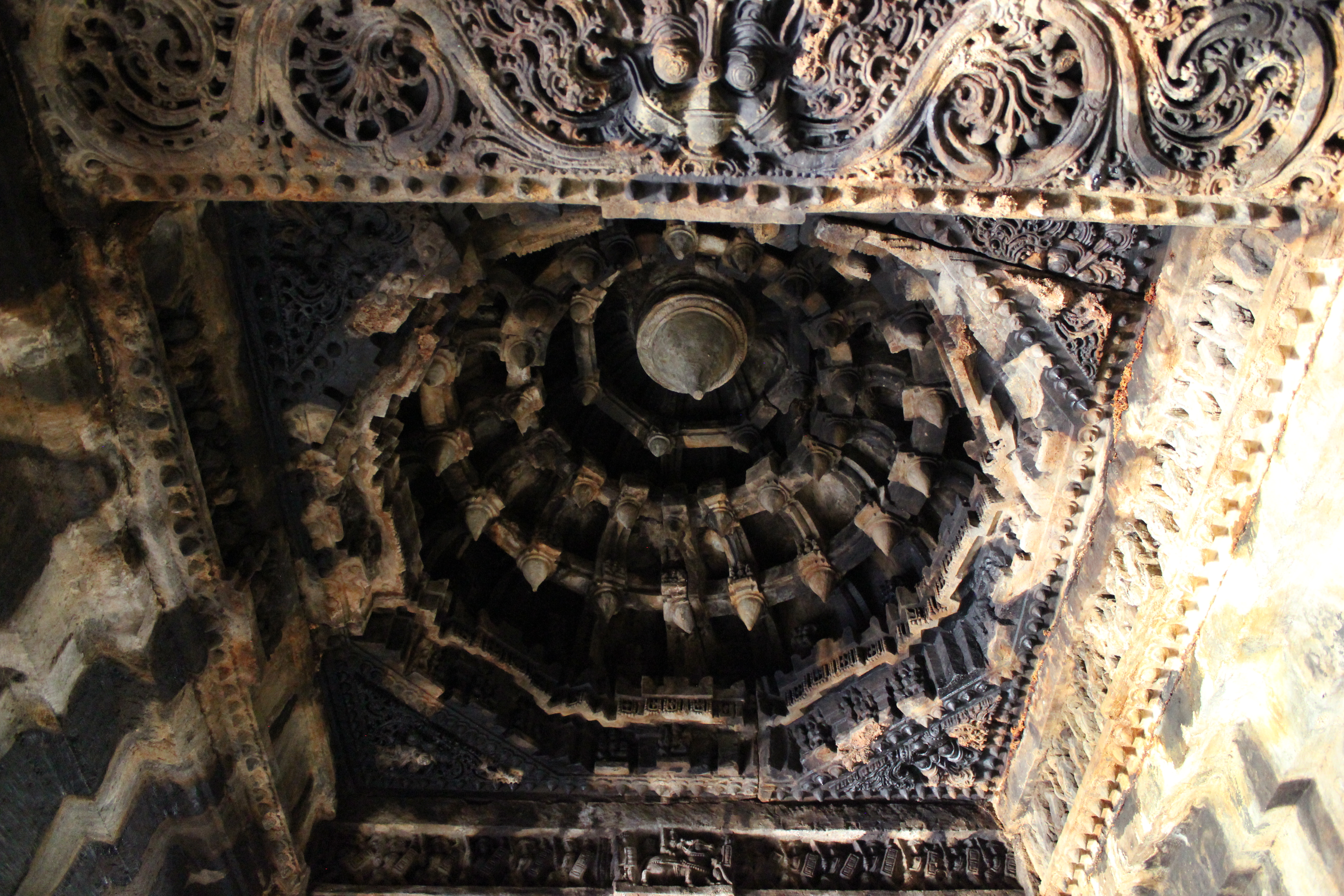
Domical bay ceiling in the mantapa of Someshvara temple at Haranahalli
