= Markandeshwar Siva Temple =

Markandesvara Siva Temple
- Location in Odisha

Religion
- Affiliation: Hinduism
- Deity: Mahishamardini

Location
- Location: Bhubaneswar
- State: Odisha
- Country: India
- Coordinates: 20°14′06″N 85°50′00″E

Architecture
- Type: Kalinga Architecture
- Completed: 10th/11th century A.D.
- Elevation: 26 m (85 ft)

Markandesvara Siva Temple was constructed by Kesaris to commemorate the visit of sage Markandeya, same as the Samesvara Siva temple. It is an abandoned temple and is facing towards the east. However at the center of the sanctum there is a Siva-lingam with the circular Yoni pitha. The temple is totally covered with wild vegetations.

== Location ==
Lat 200 14’06"N, Long 850 50’ 00"E, Elev 85 ft

=== Address & Approach ===
Same as the Samesvara Siva temple. It is an abandoned temple and is facing towards the east. However at the center of the sanctum there is a Siva-lingam with the circular Yoni pitha. The temple is totally covered with wild vegetations.

=== Any other ===
The temple is under Babulal Makaddam Badu Mohapatra on whose private land the temple stands and he stays in the northwest corner of the compound wall of the Kharakhia Vaidyanath temple precinct.

=== Name ===
Babulal Makaddam Badu Mohapatra.

=== Address ===
K h a r a k h i a Baidyanath Sahi, Old Town, Bhubaneswar

== Age ==
=== Approximate date ===
10th/11th century A.D.

=== Source of Information ===
Architectural features like trianga bada and pabhaga with four mouldings, kani is absent.

== Property Type ==
=== Precinct/ Building/ Structure/Landscape/Site/Tank ===
Building

=== Subtype ===
Temple

=== Typology ===
Vimana is in rekha deul whereas jagamohana is pidha deul.

== Property use ==
=== Abandoned/ in use ===
Abandoned

=== Past use ===
Worshipped.

== Significance ==
=== Historic significance ===
The locals assigned the temple to the Kesaris (otherwise known as Somavamsis).

== Physical description ==
=== Surrounding ===
The temple is located within the precinct of Kharakhia Vaidyanath, behind the Somesvara temple at a distance of 1.60 metres, 16 metres south of Nilakantha temple, 7.12 metres from the eastern compound wall.

=== Orientation ===
The temple is facing towards east.

=== Architectural features (Plan & Elevation) ===
On plan, the temple is pancharatha with a square vimana measures 3.80 metres. And jagamohana measures 3.70 metres in length and 4.60 metres in width. The ganthiala measures 1.00 metres in length. On elevation, the vimana is in rekha order with usual bada, gandi and mastaka that measures 5.20 metres in height. While the jagamohana is of pidha order measuring 3.80 metres in height The bada of the vimana measures 2.20 metres in height with three vertical divisions namely pabhaga, jangha and baranda. At the base, the pabhaga has four mouldings of khura, kumbha, pata and basanta that measures 0.40 metres which is partially buried. Jangha and baranda measures 1.37 metres and 0.43 metres in height respectively. The baranda has two mouldings. The superstructure of vimana has collapsed since long. However the remaining part of gandi of the vimana measures 3.00 metres in height is distinguished by a central raha and a pair of anuratha and kanika pagas on either side of raha paga. On elevation, the bada of jagamohana measures 1.86 metres in height. The pabhaga has four base mouldings which is partly buried only 0.26 metres is visible. The plain jangha measures 1.05 metres in height and the baranda has two mouldings that measure 0.55 metres. The gandi of the jagamohana measures 2.00 metres in height. The mastaka has collapsed.

=== Raha niche and parsva devatas ===
The parsvadevata niches located in the rahapaga of the jangha on the three sides of north, west and south measuring 0.72 metres in height, 0.43 metres in width and in depth of 0.23 metres enshrined a four armed Kartikeya in the western niche who is holding a peacock in the upper left and the lower right hand is in varadamudra. Other two hands are broken. The northern raha niche enshrines broken image of Parvati who is standing over a lotus pedestal. The southern raha niche is empty.

=== Decorative features ===
The temple is architecturally and sculpturally plain because of the inferiour type of building materials i.e. the laterite. However, there are two miniature rekha anghasikharas at the base of the gandi in the raha paga of the eastern wall of the vimana.

=== Doorjamb ===
The doorjamb of the vimana measures 1.85 metres in height and 1.15 metres in width. It is decorated with three vertical bands with khakharamundis at the base which is a renovated one. The doorjamb of Jagamohana measures 1.55 metres in height and 1.02 metres in width is plain.

=== Lintel ===
In the lalatabimba at the centre of the lintel of the vimana is a pidhamundi.

=== Building material ===
Dressed laterite

=== Construction techniques ===
Dry masonry.

=== Style ===
Kalingan

== State of preservation ==
=== Good/Fair/ Showing Signs of Deterioration/Advanced ===
The temple is in a dilapidated condition and would collapse at any moment.

=== State of Decay/Danger of Disappearance ===
In a rapid process of decay.

== Condition description ==
=== Signs of distress ===
Growth of vegetation on the structure and cracks are found in every wall of vimana and jagamohana.

=== Structural problems ===
Cracks all over the structure.

=== Repairs and Maintenance ===
Only the doorjamb of the vimana was renovated by the Orissa State Archaeology under the X and XI Finance Commission Award.

== Grade (A/B/C) ==
i) Architecture: B ii) Historic: C iii) Associational: C iv) Social/Cultural: C v) Others: —

== Threats to the property ==
=== Conservation problem and Remedies ===
Due to the absence of roof so far as jagamohana is concerned, rain water directly enters into the sanctum, which needs to be immediately checked by sealing the roof. 1. Growth of Vegetation: Growth of vegetation all over the monument conceals the structure, which needs to be cleared regularly. 2. The pabhaga is partially buried that may be cleared.

== Date of Documentation ==
09.09.2006

== Documenter ==
Dr. Sadasiba Pradhan and team.
