= Someshwara Swamy Temple =

Religion
- Affiliation: Hinduism
- District: Bangalore Urban
- Deity: Lord (Shiva)

Location
- Location: Agara
- State: Karnataka
- Country: India
- Interactive map of Someshwara Swamy Temple

The Someshwara Temple is located in Agara, on Sarjapura main road in Bangalore, Karnataka, India.The Co-Ordinates of this temple are:- 12°55'5"N 77°37'6"E. It is dedicated to the Deity Someshwara (the Hindu God Shiva) and dates back to the Chola period. The temple has a history of 1,200 years.
