= Someshwar Mahadev Temple =

Someshwar Mahadev Temple is an ancient temple dedicated to Shankar in Gujarat, India. It is the oldest and most important of the 12 jyotirling temples dedicated to Lord Shiva. It is better known as Somnath temple.
