= Someshwara Temple, Marathahalli =

Someshwara Temple

Religion
- Affiliation: Hinduism
- District: Bangalore
- Deity: Lord Someshwara

Location
- Location: Marathahalli
- State: Karnataka
- Country: India
- Interactive map of Someshwara Temple

Someshwara Temple is a Hindu temple in Marathahalli, Bangalore, Karnataka, India, dedicated to Siva.
