= Somesvara Siva Temple =

Somesvara Siva temple
- Location in Odisha

Religion
- Affiliation: Hinduism
- Deity: Mahishamardini

Location
- Location: Bhubaneswar
- State: Odisha
- Country: India
- Interactive map of Somesvara Siva temple
- Coordinates: 20°14′06″N 85°50′00″E

Architecture
- Type: Kalingan Style (Kalinga Architecture)
- Completed: 11th century A.D.
- Elevation: 26 m (85 ft)

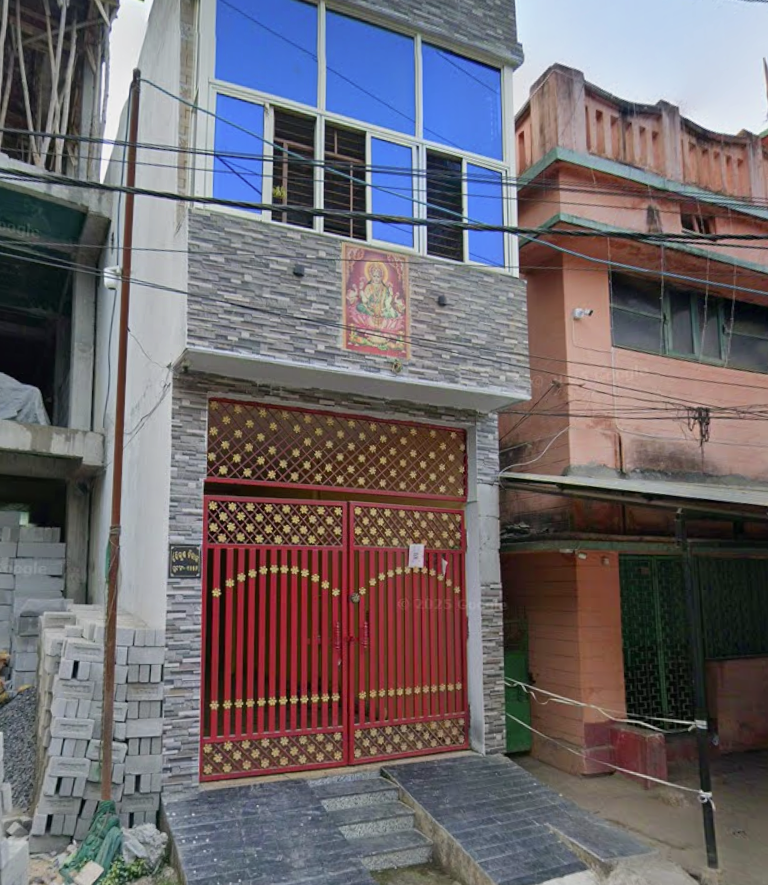

The Somesvara Siva temple is located in the Kharakhia Baidyanath temple precinct in Kharakhia Vaidyanath Sahi, Old Town, of Bhubaneswar. It is located approximately 300 metres south of Lingaraja temple. Visitors may approach the site on the left side of Baidyanath Road leading from Lingaraja temple to Kapilesvar. It is a living temple and faces towards the west. The enshrined deity of this temple is a Siva lingam within a circular yonipitha at the center of the sanctuary located 0.93 metres below the chandrasila. The temple is under the care and maintenance of Babulal Makaddam Badu Mohapatra, the chief priest of the temple, on whose private land the temple stands.

== Ownership ==
=== Single/ Multiple ===
Single.

=== Public/ Private ===
Private.

=== Name ===
Babulal Makaddam Badu Mohapatra

=== Address ===
Kharakhia Baidyanath Sahi, Old Town, Bhubaneswar

== Age ==
=== Approximate date ===
10th/11th century A.D.

=== Source of Information ===
Architectural features like trianga bada and fourfold pabhaga mouldings, kani being absent.

== Property Type ==
=== Precinct/ Building/ Structure/Landscape/Site/Tank ===
Precinct

=== Subtype ===
Temple.

=== Typology ===
Vimana is in rekha deul whereas jagamohana is of pidha deul.

== Property use ==
=== Abandoned/ in use ===
In use.

=== Present use ===
Living temple.

=== Past use ===
Worshipped.

== Significance ==
=== Cultural significance ===
Rituals like Sivaratri, Sankranti and Mahavishuva- Sankranti are celebrated.

== Physical description ==
=== Surrounding ===
Within the precinct the temple is surrounded by Markandesvara temple in the east at a distance of 1.60 metres, Nilakantha Siva temple in north within a distance of 15 metres and the compound wall in the western and southern sides.

=== Orientation ===
The temple is facing towards west.

=== Architectural features (Plan & Elevation) ===
On plan, the temple has a vimana and a jagamohana. The vimana is pancharatha having a central raha distinguished by pairs of 253 anuratha and kanika paga on either side of the raha. The vimana measures 4.40 square metres and jagamohana measures 6.20 square metres. On elevation, the vimana is of rekha order and jagamohana is in pidha order as usual in Orissan temples, having bada, gandi and mastaka. With threefold division of the bada of the vimana has a trianga bada measuring 3.18 metres in height. At the bottom, the pabhaga has four base mouldings of khura, kumbha, pata and basanta that measures 0.84 metres in height, Jangha measures 1.57 metres in height and baranda measuring 0.77 metres with a thick of has three mouldings. The gandi and mastaka measures 4.00 metres and 2.00 metres in height respectively. The bada of Jagamohana measures 2.30 metres having trianga bada. Pabhaga, jangha and baranda measures 0.71 metres, 1.09 metres, and 0.50 metres in height respectively. The gandi and mastaka of the jagamohana measures 2.50 metres and 1.20 metres.

=== Raha niche and parsva devatas ===
Parsvadevata niches located on the raha paga of the jangha on the three sides of north, south and east measuring 0.94 metres in height, 0.66 metres in width and 0.31 metres in depth are empty except the northern niche that enshrines a beautiful standing image of Parvati with broken hands.

=== Decorative features ===
Beneath the raha niche has tala garbhika decoration and in the western rahapaga there is a gajakranta at the center of the gandi. Besides this the bada and gandi of the temple are devoid of decorations. Doorjamb: The doorjambs of vimana and jagamohana are decorated with three plain vertical bands. That measures 1.83 metres in height and 1.32 metres in width. At the base of the doorjambs, there are a dvarapala niches surmounted by chaitya motifs. The niches measuring 0.36 metres in height, 0.18 metres in width and a depth of 0.07 metres houses Saivite dvarapalas holding tridents in their right hands and their left hand is in varada mudra.

=== Lintel ===
In the lalatabimba, Gajalaxmi is seated in lalitasana over a lotus pedestal. The deity is holding lotus in her left hand and her right hand is in varadamudra. The architrave above the doorjamb is carved with the navagrahas but due to the renovation work the grahas like Ravi, Rahu and Ketu are concealed.

=== Building material ===
The temple is made of laterite stone.

=== Construction techniques ===
Dry masonry.

=== Style ===
Kalingan.

=== Special features, if any ===
Though the Yonipitha is usually circular here it is square, made of laterite.

== State of preservation ==
=== Good/Fair/ Showing Signs of Deterioration/Advanced ===
Good because of the renovation work done by the Orissa State Archaeology under X and XI Finance Commission Award.

== Condition description ==
=== Signs of distress ===
Growth of vegetation.

=== Repairs and Maintenance ===
The owner of the temple clears the surrounding vegetation after the rainy season.

== Grade (A/B/C) ==
i) Architecture: B ii) Historic: C iii) Associational: C iv) Social/Cultural: B v) Others: —

== Well ==
There is a well in the center of the Kharakhia Baidyanath temple precinct, it is made of laterite blocks and it is located at a distance of 9.40 metres north of the temple.

== Threats to the property ==
=== Conservation Problem and Remedies ===
Growth of Vegetation: Creepers in the beki of jagamohana and a pipal tree on the amlaka stone. The whole temple is covered with lichens. There is a compound wall made of laterite blocks measuring 53 square metres and 2.25 metres in height with the thickness of 0.84 metres. Detached and loose sculptures: In the northern side of the vimana, there is an image of Siva.
